

37001–37100 

|-bgcolor=#d6d6d6
| 37001 ||  || — || October 3, 2000 || Socorro || LINEAR || — || align=right | 10 km || 
|-id=002 bgcolor=#E9E9E9
| 37002 ||  || — || October 3, 2000 || Socorro || LINEAR || GER || align=right | 5.0 km || 
|-id=003 bgcolor=#E9E9E9
| 37003 ||  || — || October 6, 2000 || Anderson Mesa || LONEOS || — || align=right | 4.7 km || 
|-id=004 bgcolor=#E9E9E9
| 37004 ||  || — || October 6, 2000 || Anderson Mesa || LONEOS || — || align=right | 4.7 km || 
|-id=005 bgcolor=#d6d6d6
| 37005 ||  || — || October 1, 2000 || Socorro || LINEAR || VER || align=right | 7.0 km || 
|-id=006 bgcolor=#fefefe
| 37006 ||  || — || October 1, 2000 || Socorro || LINEAR || — || align=right | 2.7 km || 
|-id=007 bgcolor=#d6d6d6
| 37007 ||  || — || October 1, 2000 || Socorro || LINEAR || EOS || align=right | 6.3 km || 
|-id=008 bgcolor=#d6d6d6
| 37008 ||  || — || October 1, 2000 || Socorro || LINEAR || — || align=right | 8.3 km || 
|-id=009 bgcolor=#d6d6d6
| 37009 ||  || — || October 1, 2000 || Socorro || LINEAR || — || align=right | 7.5 km || 
|-id=010 bgcolor=#fefefe
| 37010 ||  || — || October 1, 2000 || Socorro || LINEAR || — || align=right | 2.3 km || 
|-id=011 bgcolor=#d6d6d6
| 37011 ||  || — || October 1, 2000 || Socorro || LINEAR || EOS || align=right | 4.6 km || 
|-id=012 bgcolor=#d6d6d6
| 37012 ||  || — || October 1, 2000 || Socorro || LINEAR || 7:4 || align=right | 5.0 km || 
|-id=013 bgcolor=#fefefe
| 37013 ||  || — || October 1, 2000 || Socorro || LINEAR || — || align=right | 1.8 km || 
|-id=014 bgcolor=#d6d6d6
| 37014 ||  || — || October 1, 2000 || Socorro || LINEAR || VER || align=right | 8.1 km || 
|-id=015 bgcolor=#d6d6d6
| 37015 ||  || — || October 1, 2000 || Socorro || LINEAR || MEL || align=right | 12 km || 
|-id=016 bgcolor=#d6d6d6
| 37016 ||  || — || October 2, 2000 || Anderson Mesa || LONEOS || — || align=right | 4.9 km || 
|-id=017 bgcolor=#E9E9E9
| 37017 ||  || — || October 2, 2000 || Anderson Mesa || LONEOS || — || align=right | 2.5 km || 
|-id=018 bgcolor=#E9E9E9
| 37018 ||  || — || October 2, 2000 || Anderson Mesa || LONEOS || — || align=right | 3.7 km || 
|-id=019 bgcolor=#d6d6d6
| 37019 Jordansteckloff ||  ||  || October 2, 2000 || Anderson Mesa || LONEOS || TIR || align=right | 7.3 km || 
|-id=020 bgcolor=#E9E9E9
| 37020 ||  || — || October 6, 2000 || Anderson Mesa || LONEOS || — || align=right | 4.7 km || 
|-id=021 bgcolor=#E9E9E9
| 37021 ||  || — || October 21, 2000 || Višnjan Observatory || K. Korlević || — || align=right | 5.0 km || 
|-id=022 bgcolor=#E9E9E9
| 37022 Robertovittori ||  ||  || October 22, 2000 || Sormano || F. Manca, G. Ventre || — || align=right | 7.5 km || 
|-id=023 bgcolor=#d6d6d6
| 37023 ||  || — || October 22, 2000 || Višnjan Observatory || K. Korlević || — || align=right | 3.9 km || 
|-id=024 bgcolor=#E9E9E9
| 37024 ||  || — || October 24, 2000 || Socorro || LINEAR || DOR || align=right | 9.2 km || 
|-id=025 bgcolor=#E9E9E9
| 37025 ||  || — || October 24, 2000 || Socorro || LINEAR || — || align=right | 4.4 km || 
|-id=026 bgcolor=#d6d6d6
| 37026 ||  || — || October 24, 2000 || Socorro || LINEAR || — || align=right | 8.0 km || 
|-id=027 bgcolor=#d6d6d6
| 37027 ||  || — || October 24, 2000 || Socorro || LINEAR || THM || align=right | 5.6 km || 
|-id=028 bgcolor=#d6d6d6
| 37028 ||  || — || October 24, 2000 || Socorro || LINEAR || THM || align=right | 6.0 km || 
|-id=029 bgcolor=#d6d6d6
| 37029 ||  || — || October 24, 2000 || Socorro || LINEAR || KOR || align=right | 4.4 km || 
|-id=030 bgcolor=#d6d6d6
| 37030 ||  || — || October 24, 2000 || Socorro || LINEAR || — || align=right | 5.8 km || 
|-id=031 bgcolor=#E9E9E9
| 37031 ||  || — || October 24, 2000 || Socorro || LINEAR || — || align=right | 2.9 km || 
|-id=032 bgcolor=#E9E9E9
| 37032 ||  || — || October 24, 2000 || Socorro || LINEAR || GEF || align=right | 7.5 km || 
|-id=033 bgcolor=#d6d6d6
| 37033 ||  || — || October 24, 2000 || Socorro || LINEAR || — || align=right | 6.9 km || 
|-id=034 bgcolor=#d6d6d6
| 37034 ||  || — || October 24, 2000 || Socorro || LINEAR || — || align=right | 7.7 km || 
|-id=035 bgcolor=#d6d6d6
| 37035 ||  || — || October 24, 2000 || Socorro || LINEAR || THM || align=right | 7.9 km || 
|-id=036 bgcolor=#d6d6d6
| 37036 ||  || — || October 24, 2000 || Socorro || LINEAR || URS || align=right | 10 km || 
|-id=037 bgcolor=#d6d6d6
| 37037 ||  || — || October 24, 2000 || Socorro || LINEAR || KOR || align=right | 3.4 km || 
|-id=038 bgcolor=#E9E9E9
| 37038 ||  || — || October 24, 2000 || Socorro || LINEAR || AGN || align=right | 3.0 km || 
|-id=039 bgcolor=#d6d6d6
| 37039 ||  || — || October 24, 2000 || Socorro || LINEAR || — || align=right | 6.4 km || 
|-id=040 bgcolor=#E9E9E9
| 37040 ||  || — || October 24, 2000 || Socorro || LINEAR || — || align=right | 2.2 km || 
|-id=041 bgcolor=#E9E9E9
| 37041 ||  || — || October 24, 2000 || Socorro || LINEAR || — || align=right | 2.8 km || 
|-id=042 bgcolor=#fefefe
| 37042 ||  || — || October 24, 2000 || Socorro || LINEAR || — || align=right | 2.8 km || 
|-id=043 bgcolor=#E9E9E9
| 37043 ||  || — || October 24, 2000 || Socorro || LINEAR || — || align=right | 2.6 km || 
|-id=044 bgcolor=#d6d6d6
| 37044 Papymarcel ||  ||  || October 27, 2000 || Le Creusot || J.-C. Merlin || THM || align=right | 7.4 km || 
|-id=045 bgcolor=#d6d6d6
| 37045 ||  || — || October 24, 2000 || Socorro || LINEAR || KOR || align=right | 3.2 km || 
|-id=046 bgcolor=#E9E9E9
| 37046 ||  || — || October 24, 2000 || Socorro || LINEAR || AGN || align=right | 3.1 km || 
|-id=047 bgcolor=#d6d6d6
| 37047 ||  || — || October 24, 2000 || Socorro || LINEAR || — || align=right | 5.4 km || 
|-id=048 bgcolor=#d6d6d6
| 37048 ||  || — || October 24, 2000 || Socorro || LINEAR || KOR || align=right | 3.4 km || 
|-id=049 bgcolor=#d6d6d6
| 37049 ||  || — || October 24, 2000 || Socorro || LINEAR || — || align=right | 5.9 km || 
|-id=050 bgcolor=#d6d6d6
| 37050 ||  || — || October 24, 2000 || Socorro || LINEAR || THM || align=right | 7.3 km || 
|-id=051 bgcolor=#d6d6d6
| 37051 ||  || — || October 24, 2000 || Socorro || LINEAR || — || align=right | 8.2 km || 
|-id=052 bgcolor=#d6d6d6
| 37052 ||  || — || October 24, 2000 || Socorro || LINEAR || THM || align=right | 6.6 km || 
|-id=053 bgcolor=#E9E9E9
| 37053 ||  || — || October 24, 2000 || Socorro || LINEAR || — || align=right | 6.9 km || 
|-id=054 bgcolor=#d6d6d6
| 37054 ||  || — || October 24, 2000 || Socorro || LINEAR || — || align=right | 6.7 km || 
|-id=055 bgcolor=#E9E9E9
| 37055 ||  || — || October 24, 2000 || Socorro || LINEAR || AGN || align=right | 3.7 km || 
|-id=056 bgcolor=#fefefe
| 37056 ||  || — || October 24, 2000 || Socorro || LINEAR || NYS || align=right | 4.4 km || 
|-id=057 bgcolor=#fefefe
| 37057 ||  || — || October 24, 2000 || Socorro || LINEAR || NYS || align=right | 2.3 km || 
|-id=058 bgcolor=#E9E9E9
| 37058 ||  || — || October 24, 2000 || Socorro || LINEAR || — || align=right | 5.3 km || 
|-id=059 bgcolor=#d6d6d6
| 37059 ||  || — || October 24, 2000 || Socorro || LINEAR || — || align=right | 3.8 km || 
|-id=060 bgcolor=#d6d6d6
| 37060 ||  || — || October 24, 2000 || Socorro || LINEAR || THM || align=right | 7.6 km || 
|-id=061 bgcolor=#d6d6d6
| 37061 ||  || — || October 24, 2000 || Socorro || LINEAR || KOR || align=right | 3.6 km || 
|-id=062 bgcolor=#fefefe
| 37062 ||  || — || October 24, 2000 || Socorro || LINEAR || — || align=right | 2.4 km || 
|-id=063 bgcolor=#d6d6d6
| 37063 ||  || — || October 24, 2000 || Socorro || LINEAR || — || align=right | 6.0 km || 
|-id=064 bgcolor=#d6d6d6
| 37064 ||  || — || October 24, 2000 || Socorro || LINEAR || THM || align=right | 7.4 km || 
|-id=065 bgcolor=#d6d6d6
| 37065 ||  || — || October 24, 2000 || Socorro || LINEAR || THM || align=right | 8.8 km || 
|-id=066 bgcolor=#d6d6d6
| 37066 ||  || — || October 24, 2000 || Socorro || LINEAR || 628 || align=right | 4.8 km || 
|-id=067 bgcolor=#fefefe
| 37067 ||  || — || October 24, 2000 || Socorro || LINEAR || NYS || align=right | 2.8 km || 
|-id=068 bgcolor=#d6d6d6
| 37068 ||  || — || October 24, 2000 || Socorro || LINEAR || KOR || align=right | 3.5 km || 
|-id=069 bgcolor=#d6d6d6
| 37069 ||  || — || October 24, 2000 || Socorro || LINEAR || KOR || align=right | 3.9 km || 
|-id=070 bgcolor=#d6d6d6
| 37070 ||  || — || October 24, 2000 || Socorro || LINEAR || — || align=right | 5.7 km || 
|-id=071 bgcolor=#E9E9E9
| 37071 ||  || — || October 24, 2000 || Socorro || LINEAR || — || align=right | 4.1 km || 
|-id=072 bgcolor=#E9E9E9
| 37072 ||  || — || October 24, 2000 || Socorro || LINEAR || — || align=right | 3.3 km || 
|-id=073 bgcolor=#d6d6d6
| 37073 ||  || — || October 24, 2000 || Socorro || LINEAR || KOR || align=right | 3.5 km || 
|-id=074 bgcolor=#E9E9E9
| 37074 ||  || — || October 24, 2000 || Socorro || LINEAR || PAD || align=right | 7.6 km || 
|-id=075 bgcolor=#d6d6d6
| 37075 ||  || — || October 24, 2000 || Socorro || LINEAR || URS || align=right | 11 km || 
|-id=076 bgcolor=#d6d6d6
| 37076 ||  || — || October 24, 2000 || Socorro || LINEAR || EOS || align=right | 7.6 km || 
|-id=077 bgcolor=#E9E9E9
| 37077 ||  || — || October 24, 2000 || Socorro || LINEAR || — || align=right | 3.3 km || 
|-id=078 bgcolor=#d6d6d6
| 37078 ||  || — || October 25, 2000 || Socorro || LINEAR || — || align=right | 7.6 km || 
|-id=079 bgcolor=#fefefe
| 37079 ||  || — || October 25, 2000 || Socorro || LINEAR || FLO || align=right | 3.6 km || 
|-id=080 bgcolor=#fefefe
| 37080 ||  || — || October 25, 2000 || Socorro || LINEAR || — || align=right | 2.7 km || 
|-id=081 bgcolor=#E9E9E9
| 37081 ||  || — || October 25, 2000 || Socorro || LINEAR || EUN || align=right | 5.0 km || 
|-id=082 bgcolor=#E9E9E9
| 37082 ||  || — || October 25, 2000 || Socorro || LINEAR || — || align=right | 6.0 km || 
|-id=083 bgcolor=#fefefe
| 37083 ||  || — || October 25, 2000 || Socorro || LINEAR || — || align=right | 2.5 km || 
|-id=084 bgcolor=#fefefe
| 37084 ||  || — || October 25, 2000 || Socorro || LINEAR || — || align=right | 5.8 km || 
|-id=085 bgcolor=#fefefe
| 37085 ||  || — || October 25, 2000 || Socorro || LINEAR || — || align=right | 3.3 km || 
|-id=086 bgcolor=#fefefe
| 37086 ||  || — || October 25, 2000 || Socorro || LINEAR || V || align=right | 2.4 km || 
|-id=087 bgcolor=#d6d6d6
| 37087 ||  || — || October 25, 2000 || Socorro || LINEAR || HYG || align=right | 8.3 km || 
|-id=088 bgcolor=#fefefe
| 37088 ||  || — || October 25, 2000 || Socorro || LINEAR || V || align=right | 2.3 km || 
|-id=089 bgcolor=#E9E9E9
| 37089 ||  || — || October 25, 2000 || Socorro || LINEAR || GEF || align=right | 3.7 km || 
|-id=090 bgcolor=#E9E9E9
| 37090 ||  || — || October 25, 2000 || Socorro || LINEAR || — || align=right | 4.6 km || 
|-id=091 bgcolor=#d6d6d6
| 37091 ||  || — || October 25, 2000 || Socorro || LINEAR || EOS || align=right | 5.1 km || 
|-id=092 bgcolor=#d6d6d6
| 37092 ||  || — || October 24, 2000 || Socorro || LINEAR || — || align=right | 7.0 km || 
|-id=093 bgcolor=#d6d6d6
| 37093 ||  || — || October 31, 2000 || Socorro || LINEAR || — || align=right | 5.2 km || 
|-id=094 bgcolor=#E9E9E9
| 37094 ||  || — || October 31, 2000 || Socorro || LINEAR || — || align=right | 2.7 km || 
|-id=095 bgcolor=#d6d6d6
| 37095 ||  || — || October 31, 2000 || Socorro || LINEAR || — || align=right | 6.3 km || 
|-id=096 bgcolor=#d6d6d6
| 37096 ||  || — || October 31, 2000 || Socorro || LINEAR || EOS || align=right | 6.5 km || 
|-id=097 bgcolor=#d6d6d6
| 37097 ||  || — || October 24, 2000 || Socorro || LINEAR || — || align=right | 10 km || 
|-id=098 bgcolor=#E9E9E9
| 37098 ||  || — || October 25, 2000 || Socorro || LINEAR || — || align=right | 5.3 km || 
|-id=099 bgcolor=#E9E9E9
| 37099 ||  || — || October 25, 2000 || Socorro || LINEAR || — || align=right | 6.4 km || 
|-id=100 bgcolor=#E9E9E9
| 37100 ||  || — || October 25, 2000 || Socorro || LINEAR || — || align=right | 2.4 km || 
|}

37101–37200 

|-bgcolor=#fefefe
| 37101 ||  || — || October 25, 2000 || Socorro || LINEAR || FLO || align=right | 2.0 km || 
|-id=102 bgcolor=#fefefe
| 37102 ||  || — || October 25, 2000 || Socorro || LINEAR || — || align=right | 2.1 km || 
|-id=103 bgcolor=#E9E9E9
| 37103 ||  || — || October 25, 2000 || Socorro || LINEAR || — || align=right | 5.5 km || 
|-id=104 bgcolor=#fefefe
| 37104 ||  || — || October 25, 2000 || Socorro || LINEAR || FLO || align=right | 3.6 km || 
|-id=105 bgcolor=#d6d6d6
| 37105 ||  || — || October 25, 2000 || Socorro || LINEAR || EOS || align=right | 6.8 km || 
|-id=106 bgcolor=#fefefe
| 37106 ||  || — || October 25, 2000 || Socorro || LINEAR || slow || align=right | 3.4 km || 
|-id=107 bgcolor=#fefefe
| 37107 ||  || — || October 25, 2000 || Socorro || LINEAR || — || align=right | 2.7 km || 
|-id=108 bgcolor=#fefefe
| 37108 ||  || — || October 25, 2000 || Socorro || LINEAR || V || align=right | 2.0 km || 
|-id=109 bgcolor=#d6d6d6
| 37109 ||  || — || October 25, 2000 || Socorro || LINEAR || — || align=right | 10 km || 
|-id=110 bgcolor=#d6d6d6
| 37110 ||  || — || October 25, 2000 || Socorro || LINEAR || — || align=right | 6.4 km || 
|-id=111 bgcolor=#d6d6d6
| 37111 ||  || — || October 25, 2000 || Socorro || LINEAR || — || align=right | 8.7 km || 
|-id=112 bgcolor=#fefefe
| 37112 ||  || — || October 25, 2000 || Socorro || LINEAR || FLO || align=right | 3.0 km || 
|-id=113 bgcolor=#fefefe
| 37113 ||  || — || October 25, 2000 || Socorro || LINEAR || V || align=right | 3.5 km || 
|-id=114 bgcolor=#d6d6d6
| 37114 ||  || — || October 25, 2000 || Socorro || LINEAR || — || align=right | 7.1 km || 
|-id=115 bgcolor=#d6d6d6
| 37115 ||  || — || October 29, 2000 || Socorro || LINEAR || — || align=right | 6.9 km || 
|-id=116 bgcolor=#E9E9E9
| 37116 ||  || — || October 29, 2000 || Socorro || LINEAR || — || align=right | 5.7 km || 
|-id=117 bgcolor=#C7FF8F
| 37117 Narcissus ||  ||  || November 1, 2000 || Desert Beaver || W. K. Y. Yeung || unusual || align=right | 11 km || 
|-id=118 bgcolor=#fefefe
| 37118 ||  || — || November 1, 2000 || Socorro || LINEAR || MAS || align=right | 2.3 km || 
|-id=119 bgcolor=#E9E9E9
| 37119 ||  || — || November 1, 2000 || Socorro || LINEAR || — || align=right | 2.5 km || 
|-id=120 bgcolor=#d6d6d6
| 37120 ||  || — || November 1, 2000 || Socorro || LINEAR || — || align=right | 3.5 km || 
|-id=121 bgcolor=#E9E9E9
| 37121 ||  || — || November 1, 2000 || Socorro || LINEAR || — || align=right | 3.2 km || 
|-id=122 bgcolor=#E9E9E9
| 37122 ||  || — || November 1, 2000 || Socorro || LINEAR || — || align=right | 2.8 km || 
|-id=123 bgcolor=#d6d6d6
| 37123 ||  || — || November 1, 2000 || Socorro || LINEAR || — || align=right | 7.0 km || 
|-id=124 bgcolor=#d6d6d6
| 37124 ||  || — || November 1, 2000 || Socorro || LINEAR || THM || align=right | 6.7 km || 
|-id=125 bgcolor=#E9E9E9
| 37125 ||  || — || November 1, 2000 || Socorro || LINEAR || HOF || align=right | 6.1 km || 
|-id=126 bgcolor=#E9E9E9
| 37126 ||  || — || November 1, 2000 || Socorro || LINEAR || — || align=right | 5.5 km || 
|-id=127 bgcolor=#d6d6d6
| 37127 ||  || — || November 1, 2000 || Socorro || LINEAR || THM || align=right | 8.2 km || 
|-id=128 bgcolor=#fefefe
| 37128 ||  || — || November 1, 2000 || Socorro || LINEAR || MAS || align=right | 2.3 km || 
|-id=129 bgcolor=#d6d6d6
| 37129 ||  || — || November 1, 2000 || Socorro || LINEAR || KOR || align=right | 3.7 km || 
|-id=130 bgcolor=#fefefe
| 37130 ||  || — || November 1, 2000 || Socorro || LINEAR || NYS || align=right | 2.1 km || 
|-id=131 bgcolor=#fefefe
| 37131 ||  || — || November 1, 2000 || Socorro || LINEAR || — || align=right | 3.4 km || 
|-id=132 bgcolor=#E9E9E9
| 37132 ||  || — || November 1, 2000 || Socorro || LINEAR || GEF || align=right | 5.1 km || 
|-id=133 bgcolor=#fefefe
| 37133 ||  || — || November 1, 2000 || Socorro || LINEAR || — || align=right | 1.8 km || 
|-id=134 bgcolor=#d6d6d6
| 37134 ||  || — || November 1, 2000 || Socorro || LINEAR || EOS || align=right | 5.8 km || 
|-id=135 bgcolor=#d6d6d6
| 37135 ||  || — || November 1, 2000 || Socorro || LINEAR || HYG || align=right | 7.7 km || 
|-id=136 bgcolor=#E9E9E9
| 37136 ||  || — || November 1, 2000 || Socorro || LINEAR || — || align=right | 2.9 km || 
|-id=137 bgcolor=#fefefe
| 37137 ||  || — || November 1, 2000 || Socorro || LINEAR || NYS || align=right | 3.3 km || 
|-id=138 bgcolor=#d6d6d6
| 37138 ||  || — || November 1, 2000 || Socorro || LINEAR || KOR || align=right | 4.4 km || 
|-id=139 bgcolor=#d6d6d6
| 37139 ||  || — || November 1, 2000 || Desert Beaver || W. K. Y. Yeung || — || align=right | 4.4 km || 
|-id=140 bgcolor=#E9E9E9
| 37140 ||  || — || November 1, 2000 || Kitt Peak || Spacewatch || AGN || align=right | 2.5 km || 
|-id=141 bgcolor=#fefefe
| 37141 Povolný ||  ||  || November 2, 2000 || Ondřejov || P. Pravec || V || align=right | 2.6 km || 
|-id=142 bgcolor=#fefefe
| 37142 ||  || — || November 1, 2000 || Socorro || LINEAR || — || align=right | 2.2 km || 
|-id=143 bgcolor=#E9E9E9
| 37143 ||  || — || November 2, 2000 || Socorro || LINEAR || — || align=right | 4.4 km || 
|-id=144 bgcolor=#d6d6d6
| 37144 ||  || — || November 2, 2000 || Socorro || LINEAR || KOR || align=right | 3.8 km || 
|-id=145 bgcolor=#d6d6d6
| 37145 ||  || — || November 2, 2000 || Socorro || LINEAR || — || align=right | 3.1 km || 
|-id=146 bgcolor=#fefefe
| 37146 ||  || — || November 3, 2000 || Socorro || LINEAR || — || align=right | 2.1 km || 
|-id=147 bgcolor=#d6d6d6
| 37147 ||  || — || November 2, 2000 || Socorro || LINEAR || — || align=right | 8.6 km || 
|-id=148 bgcolor=#d6d6d6
| 37148 ||  || — || November 2, 2000 || Socorro || LINEAR || — || align=right | 9.9 km || 
|-id=149 bgcolor=#fefefe
| 37149 ||  || — || November 3, 2000 || Socorro || LINEAR || V || align=right | 2.6 km || 
|-id=150 bgcolor=#E9E9E9
| 37150 ||  || — || November 3, 2000 || Socorro || LINEAR || — || align=right | 8.8 km || 
|-id=151 bgcolor=#d6d6d6
| 37151 ||  || — || November 3, 2000 || Socorro || LINEAR || — || align=right | 7.7 km || 
|-id=152 bgcolor=#FA8072
| 37152 ||  || — || November 3, 2000 || Socorro || LINEAR || — || align=right | 5.8 km || 
|-id=153 bgcolor=#d6d6d6
| 37153 ||  || — || November 3, 2000 || Socorro || LINEAR || — || align=right | 7.8 km || 
|-id=154 bgcolor=#fefefe
| 37154 ||  || — || November 8, 2000 || Desert Beaver || W. K. Y. Yeung || — || align=right | 5.5 km || 
|-id=155 bgcolor=#d6d6d6
| 37155 ||  || — || November 5, 2000 || Socorro || LINEAR || HIL3:2 || align=right | 12 km || 
|-id=156 bgcolor=#d6d6d6
| 37156 ||  || — || November 1, 2000 || Socorro || LINEAR || — || align=right | 7.7 km || 
|-id=157 bgcolor=#d6d6d6
| 37157 ||  || — || November 2, 2000 || Socorro || LINEAR || HYG || align=right | 7.8 km || 
|-id=158 bgcolor=#E9E9E9
| 37158 ||  || — || November 9, 2000 || Socorro || LINEAR || — || align=right | 5.9 km || 
|-id=159 bgcolor=#d6d6d6
| 37159 || 2000 WX || — || November 17, 2000 || Desert Beaver || W. K. Y. Yeung || — || align=right | 6.2 km || 
|-id=160 bgcolor=#d6d6d6
| 37160 ||  || — || November 19, 2000 || Socorro || LINEAR || — || align=right | 14 km || 
|-id=161 bgcolor=#E9E9E9
| 37161 ||  || — || November 20, 2000 || Haleakala || NEAT || — || align=right | 4.1 km || 
|-id=162 bgcolor=#d6d6d6
| 37162 ||  || — || November 22, 2000 || Farpoint || G. Hug || — || align=right | 6.0 km || 
|-id=163 bgcolor=#E9E9E9
| 37163 Huachucaclub ||  ||  || November 19, 2000 || Junk Bond || J. Medkeff, D. Healy || — || align=right | 3.6 km || 
|-id=164 bgcolor=#d6d6d6
| 37164 ||  || — || November 22, 2000 || Haleakala || NEAT || EOS || align=right | 6.0 km || 
|-id=165 bgcolor=#E9E9E9
| 37165 ||  || — || November 20, 2000 || Socorro || LINEAR || MAR || align=right | 4.3 km || 
|-id=166 bgcolor=#d6d6d6
| 37166 ||  || — || November 20, 2000 || Socorro || LINEAR || — || align=right | 9.8 km || 
|-id=167 bgcolor=#d6d6d6
| 37167 ||  || — || November 20, 2000 || Socorro || LINEAR || EOS || align=right | 5.1 km || 
|-id=168 bgcolor=#d6d6d6
| 37168 ||  || — || November 20, 2000 || Socorro || LINEAR || CHA || align=right | 4.7 km || 
|-id=169 bgcolor=#E9E9E9
| 37169 ||  || — || November 20, 2000 || Socorro || LINEAR || GEF || align=right | 3.8 km || 
|-id=170 bgcolor=#d6d6d6
| 37170 ||  || — || November 25, 2000 || Socorro || LINEAR || 7:4 || align=right | 11 km || 
|-id=171 bgcolor=#E9E9E9
| 37171 ||  || — || November 23, 2000 || Haleakala || NEAT || — || align=right | 3.6 km || 
|-id=172 bgcolor=#d6d6d6
| 37172 ||  || — || November 20, 2000 || Socorro || LINEAR || EOS || align=right | 6.0 km || 
|-id=173 bgcolor=#d6d6d6
| 37173 ||  || — || November 20, 2000 || Socorro || LINEAR || — || align=right | 6.2 km || 
|-id=174 bgcolor=#E9E9E9
| 37174 ||  || — || November 20, 2000 || Socorro || LINEAR || — || align=right | 3.2 km || 
|-id=175 bgcolor=#d6d6d6
| 37175 ||  || — || November 20, 2000 || Socorro || LINEAR || — || align=right | 6.4 km || 
|-id=176 bgcolor=#E9E9E9
| 37176 ||  || — || November 21, 2000 || Socorro || LINEAR || — || align=right | 3.5 km || 
|-id=177 bgcolor=#E9E9E9
| 37177 ||  || — || November 21, 2000 || Socorro || LINEAR || — || align=right | 2.9 km || 
|-id=178 bgcolor=#E9E9E9
| 37178 ||  || — || November 21, 2000 || Socorro || LINEAR || — || align=right | 6.4 km || 
|-id=179 bgcolor=#E9E9E9
| 37179 ||  || — || November 21, 2000 || Socorro || LINEAR || — || align=right | 3.8 km || 
|-id=180 bgcolor=#d6d6d6
| 37180 ||  || — || November 21, 2000 || Socorro || LINEAR || EOS || align=right | 5.7 km || 
|-id=181 bgcolor=#E9E9E9
| 37181 ||  || — || November 25, 2000 || Socorro || LINEAR || — || align=right | 3.7 km || 
|-id=182 bgcolor=#d6d6d6
| 37182 ||  || — || November 25, 2000 || Socorro || LINEAR || TIR || align=right | 5.0 km || 
|-id=183 bgcolor=#E9E9E9
| 37183 ||  || — || November 26, 2000 || Socorro || LINEAR || — || align=right | 4.5 km || 
|-id=184 bgcolor=#d6d6d6
| 37184 ||  || — || November 27, 2000 || Kitt Peak || Spacewatch || KOR || align=right | 4.1 km || 
|-id=185 bgcolor=#d6d6d6
| 37185 ||  || — || November 21, 2000 || Socorro || LINEAR || — || align=right | 13 km || 
|-id=186 bgcolor=#d6d6d6
| 37186 ||  || — || November 21, 2000 || Socorro || LINEAR || — || align=right | 12 km || 
|-id=187 bgcolor=#E9E9E9
| 37187 ||  || — || November 21, 2000 || Socorro || LINEAR || — || align=right | 13 km || 
|-id=188 bgcolor=#E9E9E9
| 37188 ||  || — || November 21, 2000 || Socorro || LINEAR || — || align=right | 3.4 km || 
|-id=189 bgcolor=#d6d6d6
| 37189 ||  || — || November 23, 2000 || Haleakala || NEAT || — || align=right | 5.7 km || 
|-id=190 bgcolor=#fefefe
| 37190 ||  || — || November 28, 2000 || Fountain Hills || C. W. Juels || PHO || align=right | 3.3 km || 
|-id=191 bgcolor=#fefefe
| 37191 ||  || — || November 19, 2000 || Socorro || LINEAR || — || align=right | 3.4 km || 
|-id=192 bgcolor=#fefefe
| 37192 ||  || — || November 19, 2000 || Socorro || LINEAR || V || align=right | 2.4 km || 
|-id=193 bgcolor=#d6d6d6
| 37193 ||  || — || November 20, 2000 || Socorro || LINEAR || CHA || align=right | 4.8 km || 
|-id=194 bgcolor=#fefefe
| 37194 ||  || — || November 20, 2000 || Socorro || LINEAR || — || align=right | 3.2 km || 
|-id=195 bgcolor=#d6d6d6
| 37195 ||  || — || November 20, 2000 || Socorro || LINEAR || — || align=right | 6.5 km || 
|-id=196 bgcolor=#E9E9E9
| 37196 ||  || — || November 20, 2000 || Socorro || LINEAR || — || align=right | 5.8 km || 
|-id=197 bgcolor=#E9E9E9
| 37197 ||  || — || November 20, 2000 || Socorro || LINEAR || — || align=right | 3.0 km || 
|-id=198 bgcolor=#d6d6d6
| 37198 ||  || — || November 20, 2000 || Socorro || LINEAR || EOS || align=right | 4.9 km || 
|-id=199 bgcolor=#d6d6d6
| 37199 ||  || — || November 21, 2000 || Socorro || LINEAR || 7:4 || align=right | 9.6 km || 
|-id=200 bgcolor=#E9E9E9
| 37200 ||  || — || November 21, 2000 || Socorro || LINEAR || — || align=right | 6.5 km || 
|}

37201–37300 

|-bgcolor=#d6d6d6
| 37201 ||  || — || November 21, 2000 || Socorro || LINEAR || KOR || align=right | 4.7 km || 
|-id=202 bgcolor=#E9E9E9
| 37202 ||  || — || November 21, 2000 || Socorro || LINEAR || — || align=right | 4.3 km || 
|-id=203 bgcolor=#d6d6d6
| 37203 ||  || — || November 21, 2000 || Socorro || LINEAR || EOS || align=right | 11 km || 
|-id=204 bgcolor=#d6d6d6
| 37204 ||  || — || November 21, 2000 || Socorro || LINEAR || EOS || align=right | 7.6 km || 
|-id=205 bgcolor=#d6d6d6
| 37205 ||  || — || November 26, 2000 || Socorro || LINEAR || EOS || align=right | 3.6 km || 
|-id=206 bgcolor=#E9E9E9
| 37206 ||  || — || November 26, 2000 || Socorro || LINEAR || — || align=right | 4.4 km || 
|-id=207 bgcolor=#d6d6d6
| 37207 ||  || — || November 26, 2000 || Socorro || LINEAR || — || align=right | 8.1 km || 
|-id=208 bgcolor=#fefefe
| 37208 ||  || — || November 27, 2000 || Socorro || LINEAR || — || align=right | 2.4 km || 
|-id=209 bgcolor=#d6d6d6
| 37209 ||  || — || November 20, 2000 || Socorro || LINEAR || — || align=right | 7.3 km || 
|-id=210 bgcolor=#E9E9E9
| 37210 ||  || — || November 20, 2000 || Socorro || LINEAR || ADE || align=right | 6.6 km || 
|-id=211 bgcolor=#d6d6d6
| 37211 ||  || — || November 20, 2000 || Socorro || LINEAR || EOS || align=right | 6.9 km || 
|-id=212 bgcolor=#d6d6d6
| 37212 ||  || — || November 16, 2000 || Kitt Peak || Spacewatch || slow || align=right | 7.2 km || 
|-id=213 bgcolor=#E9E9E9
| 37213 ||  || — || November 17, 2000 || Kitt Peak || Spacewatch || — || align=right | 6.3 km || 
|-id=214 bgcolor=#E9E9E9
| 37214 ||  || — || November 19, 2000 || Kitt Peak || Spacewatch || — || align=right | 3.4 km || 
|-id=215 bgcolor=#E9E9E9
| 37215 ||  || — || November 20, 2000 || Anderson Mesa || LONEOS || — || align=right | 3.7 km || 
|-id=216 bgcolor=#d6d6d6
| 37216 ||  || — || November 19, 2000 || Socorro || LINEAR || — || align=right | 7.1 km || 
|-id=217 bgcolor=#E9E9E9
| 37217 ||  || — || November 20, 2000 || Anderson Mesa || LONEOS || — || align=right | 7.7 km || 
|-id=218 bgcolor=#d6d6d6
| 37218 Kimyoonyoung ||  ||  || November 20, 2000 || Anderson Mesa || LONEOS || URS || align=right | 4.7 km || 
|-id=219 bgcolor=#E9E9E9
| 37219 ||  || — || November 20, 2000 || Anderson Mesa || LONEOS || EUN || align=right | 4.3 km || 
|-id=220 bgcolor=#fefefe
| 37220 ||  || — || November 21, 2000 || Socorro || LINEAR || — || align=right | 2.2 km || 
|-id=221 bgcolor=#E9E9E9
| 37221 ||  || — || November 20, 2000 || Anderson Mesa || LONEOS || — || align=right | 3.2 km || 
|-id=222 bgcolor=#E9E9E9
| 37222 ||  || — || November 20, 2000 || Anderson Mesa || LONEOS || EUN || align=right | 3.1 km || 
|-id=223 bgcolor=#E9E9E9
| 37223 ||  || — || November 20, 2000 || Anderson Mesa || LONEOS || EUN || align=right | 3.6 km || 
|-id=224 bgcolor=#E9E9E9
| 37224 ||  || — || November 20, 2000 || Anderson Mesa || LONEOS || — || align=right | 4.6 km || 
|-id=225 bgcolor=#E9E9E9
| 37225 ||  || — || November 20, 2000 || Anderson Mesa || LONEOS || MAR || align=right | 3.6 km || 
|-id=226 bgcolor=#E9E9E9
| 37226 ||  || — || November 20, 2000 || Anderson Mesa || LONEOS || MAR || align=right | 4.1 km || 
|-id=227 bgcolor=#E9E9E9
| 37227 ||  || — || November 20, 2000 || Anderson Mesa || LONEOS || — || align=right | 11 km || 
|-id=228 bgcolor=#E9E9E9
| 37228 ||  || — || November 23, 2000 || Haleakala || NEAT || HNS || align=right | 2.8 km || 
|-id=229 bgcolor=#E9E9E9
| 37229 ||  || — || November 23, 2000 || Haleakala || NEAT || MAR || align=right | 3.2 km || 
|-id=230 bgcolor=#d6d6d6
| 37230 ||  || — || November 28, 2000 || Haleakala || NEAT || — || align=right | 5.4 km || 
|-id=231 bgcolor=#fefefe
| 37231 ||  || — || November 29, 2000 || Haleakala || NEAT || — || align=right | 2.6 km || 
|-id=232 bgcolor=#d6d6d6
| 37232 ||  || — || November 30, 2000 || Socorro || LINEAR || — || align=right | 3.7 km || 
|-id=233 bgcolor=#fefefe
| 37233 ||  || — || November 30, 2000 || Socorro || LINEAR || KLI || align=right | 5.3 km || 
|-id=234 bgcolor=#fefefe
| 37234 ||  || — || November 30, 2000 || Socorro || LINEAR || V || align=right | 2.9 km || 
|-id=235 bgcolor=#fefefe
| 37235 ||  || — || November 30, 2000 || Socorro || LINEAR || FLO || align=right | 1.8 km || 
|-id=236 bgcolor=#d6d6d6
| 37236 ||  || — || November 20, 2000 || Anderson Mesa || LONEOS || EOS || align=right | 4.5 km || 
|-id=237 bgcolor=#d6d6d6
| 37237 ||  || — || November 20, 2000 || Anderson Mesa || LONEOS || 2:1J || align=right | 11 km || 
|-id=238 bgcolor=#fefefe
| 37238 ||  || — || November 24, 2000 || Anderson Mesa || LONEOS || — || align=right | 2.5 km || 
|-id=239 bgcolor=#E9E9E9
| 37239 ||  || — || November 25, 2000 || Socorro || LINEAR || — || align=right | 4.0 km || 
|-id=240 bgcolor=#E9E9E9
| 37240 ||  || — || November 25, 2000 || Socorro || LINEAR || — || align=right | 3.5 km || 
|-id=241 bgcolor=#E9E9E9
| 37241 ||  || — || November 25, 2000 || Socorro || LINEAR || — || align=right | 3.2 km || 
|-id=242 bgcolor=#E9E9E9
| 37242 ||  || — || November 25, 2000 || Socorro || LINEAR || MAR || align=right | 3.8 km || 
|-id=243 bgcolor=#E9E9E9
| 37243 ||  || — || November 26, 2000 || Socorro || LINEAR || — || align=right | 5.3 km || 
|-id=244 bgcolor=#d6d6d6
| 37244 ||  || — || November 26, 2000 || Socorro || LINEAR || — || align=right | 12 km || 
|-id=245 bgcolor=#d6d6d6
| 37245 ||  || — || November 26, 2000 || Socorro || LINEAR || — || align=right | 5.8 km || 
|-id=246 bgcolor=#d6d6d6
| 37246 ||  || — || November 27, 2000 || Socorro || LINEAR || — || align=right | 8.4 km || 
|-id=247 bgcolor=#E9E9E9
| 37247 ||  || — || November 30, 2000 || Anderson Mesa || LONEOS || — || align=right | 3.3 km || 
|-id=248 bgcolor=#E9E9E9
| 37248 ||  || — || November 25, 2000 || Socorro || LINEAR || — || align=right | 3.2 km || 
|-id=249 bgcolor=#E9E9E9
| 37249 ||  || — || November 17, 2000 || Socorro || LINEAR || — || align=right | 6.2 km || 
|-id=250 bgcolor=#d6d6d6
| 37250 ||  || — || November 30, 2000 || Anderson Mesa || LONEOS || — || align=right | 9.1 km || 
|-id=251 bgcolor=#d6d6d6
| 37251 ||  || — || November 29, 2000 || Kitt Peak || Spacewatch || — || align=right | 5.3 km || 
|-id=252 bgcolor=#d6d6d6
| 37252 ||  || — || November 27, 2000 || Socorro || LINEAR || — || align=right | 9.2 km || 
|-id=253 bgcolor=#E9E9E9
| 37253 ||  || — || November 18, 2000 || Anderson Mesa || LONEOS || — || align=right | 5.2 km || 
|-id=254 bgcolor=#E9E9E9
| 37254 ||  || — || November 18, 2000 || Anderson Mesa || LONEOS || — || align=right | 4.8 km || 
|-id=255 bgcolor=#d6d6d6
| 37255 ||  || — || November 18, 2000 || Anderson Mesa || LONEOS || HYG || align=right | 5.2 km || 
|-id=256 bgcolor=#d6d6d6
| 37256 ||  || — || November 19, 2000 || Anderson Mesa || LONEOS || — || align=right | 6.8 km || 
|-id=257 bgcolor=#d6d6d6
| 37257 ||  || — || December 1, 2000 || Socorro || LINEAR || — || align=right | 7.4 km || 
|-id=258 bgcolor=#fefefe
| 37258 ||  || — || December 1, 2000 || Socorro || LINEAR || — || align=right | 3.6 km || 
|-id=259 bgcolor=#d6d6d6
| 37259 ||  || — || December 1, 2000 || Socorro || LINEAR || — || align=right | 7.9 km || 
|-id=260 bgcolor=#d6d6d6
| 37260 ||  || — || December 1, 2000 || Socorro || LINEAR || EOS || align=right | 7.1 km || 
|-id=261 bgcolor=#E9E9E9
| 37261 ||  || — || December 1, 2000 || Socorro || LINEAR || GEF || align=right | 3.4 km || 
|-id=262 bgcolor=#E9E9E9
| 37262 ||  || — || December 1, 2000 || Socorro || LINEAR || — || align=right | 4.6 km || 
|-id=263 bgcolor=#E9E9E9
| 37263 ||  || — || December 4, 2000 || Socorro || LINEAR || EUN || align=right | 3.7 km || 
|-id=264 bgcolor=#d6d6d6
| 37264 ||  || — || December 1, 2000 || Socorro || LINEAR || EMA || align=right | 11 km || 
|-id=265 bgcolor=#E9E9E9
| 37265 ||  || — || December 4, 2000 || Socorro || LINEAR || — || align=right | 6.7 km || 
|-id=266 bgcolor=#E9E9E9
| 37266 ||  || — || December 4, 2000 || Socorro || LINEAR || — || align=right | 5.9 km || 
|-id=267 bgcolor=#E9E9E9
| 37267 ||  || — || December 4, 2000 || Socorro || LINEAR || EUN || align=right | 3.4 km || 
|-id=268 bgcolor=#d6d6d6
| 37268 ||  || — || December 4, 2000 || Socorro || LINEAR || — || align=right | 4.9 km || 
|-id=269 bgcolor=#E9E9E9
| 37269 ||  || — || December 4, 2000 || Socorro || LINEAR || — || align=right | 4.3 km || 
|-id=270 bgcolor=#d6d6d6
| 37270 ||  || — || December 4, 2000 || Socorro || LINEAR || — || align=right | 10 km || 
|-id=271 bgcolor=#E9E9E9
| 37271 ||  || — || December 4, 2000 || Socorro || LINEAR || EUN || align=right | 3.8 km || 
|-id=272 bgcolor=#d6d6d6
| 37272 ||  || — || December 4, 2000 || Socorro || LINEAR || ALA || align=right | 12 km || 
|-id=273 bgcolor=#E9E9E9
| 37273 ||  || — || December 5, 2000 || Socorro || LINEAR || — || align=right | 3.3 km || 
|-id=274 bgcolor=#fefefe
| 37274 ||  || — || December 5, 2000 || Socorro || LINEAR || — || align=right | 5.6 km || 
|-id=275 bgcolor=#E9E9E9
| 37275 ||  || — || December 5, 2000 || Socorro || LINEAR || — || align=right | 6.3 km || 
|-id=276 bgcolor=#E9E9E9
| 37276 ||  || — || December 5, 2000 || Socorro || LINEAR || — || align=right | 3.7 km || 
|-id=277 bgcolor=#fefefe
| 37277 || 2000 YJ || — || December 16, 2000 || Socorro || LINEAR || — || align=right | 3.1 km || 
|-id=278 bgcolor=#E9E9E9
| 37278 ||  || — || December 20, 2000 || Socorro || LINEAR || — || align=right | 6.6 km || 
|-id=279 bgcolor=#E9E9E9
| 37279 Hukvaldy ||  ||  || December 22, 2000 || Ondřejov || P. Pravec, P. Kušnirák || — || align=right | 4.9 km || 
|-id=280 bgcolor=#d6d6d6
| 37280 ||  || — || December 28, 2000 || Fair Oaks Ranch || J. V. McClusky || ALA || align=right | 9.7 km || 
|-id=281 bgcolor=#C2FFFF
| 37281 ||  || — || December 30, 2000 || Socorro || LINEAR || L4 || align=right | 16 km || 
|-id=282 bgcolor=#d6d6d6
| 37282 ||  || — || December 28, 2000 || Socorro || LINEAR || — || align=right | 9.2 km || 
|-id=283 bgcolor=#d6d6d6
| 37283 ||  || — || December 30, 2000 || Socorro || LINEAR || — || align=right | 7.5 km || 
|-id=284 bgcolor=#d6d6d6
| 37284 ||  || — || December 30, 2000 || Socorro || LINEAR || — || align=right | 6.3 km || 
|-id=285 bgcolor=#fefefe
| 37285 ||  || — || December 30, 2000 || Socorro || LINEAR || FLO || align=right | 2.5 km || 
|-id=286 bgcolor=#d6d6d6
| 37286 ||  || — || December 28, 2000 || Socorro || LINEAR || ALA || align=right | 19 km || 
|-id=287 bgcolor=#E9E9E9
| 37287 ||  || — || December 28, 2000 || Socorro || LINEAR || — || align=right | 6.2 km || 
|-id=288 bgcolor=#E9E9E9
| 37288 ||  || — || December 22, 2000 || Haleakala || NEAT || — || align=right | 6.2 km || 
|-id=289 bgcolor=#d6d6d6
| 37289 ||  || — || December 29, 2000 || Anderson Mesa || LONEOS || KOR || align=right | 3.8 km || 
|-id=290 bgcolor=#E9E9E9
| 37290 ||  || — || December 22, 2000 || Haleakala || NEAT || — || align=right | 11 km || 
|-id=291 bgcolor=#d6d6d6
| 37291 ||  || — || January 5, 2001 || Socorro || LINEAR || 7:4 || align=right | 11 km || 
|-id=292 bgcolor=#d6d6d6
| 37292 ||  || — || January 4, 2001 || Socorro || LINEAR || SAN || align=right | 5.6 km || 
|-id=293 bgcolor=#d6d6d6
| 37293 ||  || — || January 4, 2001 || Anderson Mesa || LONEOS || — || align=right | 6.1 km || 
|-id=294 bgcolor=#E9E9E9
| 37294 ||  || — || January 19, 2001 || Socorro || LINEAR || — || align=right | 3.2 km || 
|-id=295 bgcolor=#E9E9E9
| 37295 ||  || — || January 21, 2001 || Socorro || LINEAR || — || align=right | 3.6 km || 
|-id=296 bgcolor=#E9E9E9
| 37296 ||  || — || January 19, 2001 || Socorro || LINEAR || EUN || align=right | 3.4 km || 
|-id=297 bgcolor=#C2FFFF
| 37297 ||  || — || January 26, 2001 || Haleakala || NEAT || L4 || align=right | 27 km || 
|-id=298 bgcolor=#C2FFFF
| 37298 ||  || — || January 19, 2001 || Socorro || LINEAR || L4 || align=right | 22 km || 
|-id=299 bgcolor=#C2FFFF
| 37299 ||  || — || February 1, 2001 || Anderson Mesa || LONEOS || L4 || align=right | 25 km || 
|-id=300 bgcolor=#C2FFFF
| 37300 ||  || — || February 13, 2001 || Socorro || LINEAR || L4 || align=right | 22 km || 
|}

37301–37400 

|-bgcolor=#C2FFFF
| 37301 ||  || — || February 13, 2001 || Socorro || LINEAR || L4 || align=right | 27 km || 
|-id=302 bgcolor=#E9E9E9
| 37302 ||  || — || March 2, 2001 || Haleakala || NEAT || — || align=right | 3.2 km || 
|-id=303 bgcolor=#E9E9E9
| 37303 ||  || — || March 15, 2001 || Kitt Peak || Spacewatch || — || align=right | 3.7 km || 
|-id=304 bgcolor=#d6d6d6
| 37304 ||  || — || March 15, 2001 || Haleakala || NEAT || — || align=right | 7.6 km || 
|-id=305 bgcolor=#fefefe
| 37305 ||  || — || April 24, 2001 || Socorro || LINEAR || V || align=right | 2.0 km || 
|-id=306 bgcolor=#E9E9E9
| 37306 ||  || — || May 22, 2001 || Socorro || LINEAR || — || align=right | 7.0 km || 
|-id=307 bgcolor=#fefefe
| 37307 ||  || — || June 13, 2001 || Haleakala || NEAT || FLO || align=right | 1.7 km || 
|-id=308 bgcolor=#FA8072
| 37308 ||  || — || July 21, 2001 || Palomar || NEAT || — || align=right | 1.2 km || 
|-id=309 bgcolor=#E9E9E9
| 37309 Pajuelo ||  ||  || July 20, 2001 || Anderson Mesa || LONEOS || MAR || align=right | 4.7 km || 
|-id=310 bgcolor=#fefefe
| 37310 ||  || — || July 29, 2001 || Socorro || LINEAR || V || align=right | 2.8 km || 
|-id=311 bgcolor=#d6d6d6
| 37311 ||  || — || August 14, 2001 || Haleakala || NEAT || — || align=right | 7.2 km || 
|-id=312 bgcolor=#d6d6d6
| 37312 ||  || — || August 13, 2001 || Palomar || NEAT || EOS || align=right | 5.3 km || 
|-id=313 bgcolor=#d6d6d6
| 37313 Paolocampaner || 2001 QC ||  || August 16, 2001 || San Marcello || M. Tombelli, A. Boattini || — || align=right | 5.5 km || 
|-id=314 bgcolor=#FA8072
| 37314 || 2001 QP || — || August 16, 2001 || Socorro || LINEAR || — || align=right | 3.2 km || 
|-id=315 bgcolor=#fefefe
| 37315 ||  || — || August 16, 2001 || Socorro || LINEAR || — || align=right | 1.9 km || 
|-id=316 bgcolor=#E9E9E9
| 37316 ||  || — || August 16, 2001 || Socorro || LINEAR || DOR || align=right | 8.6 km || 
|-id=317 bgcolor=#E9E9E9
| 37317 ||  || — || August 16, 2001 || Socorro || LINEAR || — || align=right | 4.3 km || 
|-id=318 bgcolor=#E9E9E9
| 37318 ||  || — || August 16, 2001 || Socorro || LINEAR || — || align=right | 3.9 km || 
|-id=319 bgcolor=#E9E9E9
| 37319 ||  || — || August 16, 2001 || Socorro || LINEAR || DOR || align=right | 9.4 km || 
|-id=320 bgcolor=#fefefe
| 37320 ||  || — || August 16, 2001 || Socorro || LINEAR || — || align=right | 2.0 km || 
|-id=321 bgcolor=#E9E9E9
| 37321 ||  || — || August 17, 2001 || Socorro || LINEAR || — || align=right | 4.8 km || 
|-id=322 bgcolor=#E9E9E9
| 37322 ||  || — || August 16, 2001 || Socorro || LINEAR || — || align=right | 5.6 km || 
|-id=323 bgcolor=#E9E9E9
| 37323 ||  || — || August 16, 2001 || Socorro || LINEAR || — || align=right | 3.4 km || 
|-id=324 bgcolor=#E9E9E9
| 37324 ||  || — || August 16, 2001 || Socorro || LINEAR || — || align=right | 3.1 km || 
|-id=325 bgcolor=#E9E9E9
| 37325 ||  || — || August 16, 2001 || Socorro || LINEAR || — || align=right | 7.3 km || 
|-id=326 bgcolor=#d6d6d6
| 37326 ||  || — || August 16, 2001 || Socorro || LINEAR || — || align=right | 11 km || 
|-id=327 bgcolor=#E9E9E9
| 37327 ||  || — || August 16, 2001 || Socorro || LINEAR || — || align=right | 2.5 km || 
|-id=328 bgcolor=#E9E9E9
| 37328 ||  || — || August 22, 2001 || Socorro || LINEAR || EUN || align=right | 7.4 km || 
|-id=329 bgcolor=#FA8072
| 37329 ||  || — || August 23, 2001 || Palomar || NEAT || — || align=right | 1.7 km || 
|-id=330 bgcolor=#d6d6d6
| 37330 ||  || — || August 22, 2001 || Socorro || LINEAR || EOS || align=right | 6.9 km || 
|-id=331 bgcolor=#E9E9E9
| 37331 ||  || — || August 22, 2001 || Socorro || LINEAR || — || align=right | 7.4 km || 
|-id=332 bgcolor=#E9E9E9
| 37332 ||  || — || August 22, 2001 || Socorro || LINEAR || EUN || align=right | 4.6 km || 
|-id=333 bgcolor=#fefefe
| 37333 ||  || — || August 27, 2001 || Palomar || NEAT || — || align=right | 3.2 km || 
|-id=334 bgcolor=#d6d6d6
| 37334 ||  || — || August 22, 2001 || Socorro || LINEAR || HYG || align=right | 5.0 km || 
|-id=335 bgcolor=#fefefe
| 37335 ||  || — || August 20, 2001 || Socorro || LINEAR || — || align=right | 2.5 km || 
|-id=336 bgcolor=#FFC2E0
| 37336 || 2001 RM || — || September 6, 2001 || Socorro || LINEAR || AMO +1km || align=right | 2.6 km || 
|-id=337 bgcolor=#d6d6d6
| 37337 ||  || — || September 10, 2001 || Socorro || LINEAR || URS || align=right | 11 km || 
|-id=338 bgcolor=#d6d6d6
| 37338 ||  || — || September 11, 2001 || Anderson Mesa || LONEOS || 7:4 || align=right | 10 km || 
|-id=339 bgcolor=#E9E9E9
| 37339 ||  || — || September 11, 2001 || Anderson Mesa || LONEOS || — || align=right | 3.8 km || 
|-id=340 bgcolor=#E9E9E9
| 37340 ||  || — || September 12, 2001 || Socorro || LINEAR || — || align=right | 3.1 km || 
|-id=341 bgcolor=#fefefe
| 37341 ||  || — || September 16, 2001 || Socorro || LINEAR || — || align=right | 1.3 km || 
|-id=342 bgcolor=#E9E9E9
| 37342 ||  || — || September 16, 2001 || Socorro || LINEAR || RAF || align=right | 3.5 km || 
|-id=343 bgcolor=#E9E9E9
| 37343 ||  || — || September 16, 2001 || Socorro || LINEAR || — || align=right | 1.9 km || 
|-id=344 bgcolor=#d6d6d6
| 37344 ||  || — || September 16, 2001 || Socorro || LINEAR || — || align=right | 10 km || 
|-id=345 bgcolor=#d6d6d6
| 37345 ||  || — || September 17, 2001 || Socorro || LINEAR || — || align=right | 10 km || 
|-id=346 bgcolor=#d6d6d6
| 37346 ||  || — || September 17, 2001 || Socorro || LINEAR || KOR || align=right | 3.6 km || 
|-id=347 bgcolor=#E9E9E9
| 37347 ||  || — || September 22, 2001 || Palomar || NEAT || — || align=right | 3.5 km || 
|-id=348 bgcolor=#fefefe
| 37348 ||  || — || September 27, 2001 || Palomar || NEAT || — || align=right | 2.5 km || 
|-id=349 bgcolor=#E9E9E9
| 37349 Lynnaequick ||  ||  || September 17, 2001 || Anderson Mesa || LONEOS || ADE || align=right | 7.0 km || 
|-id=350 bgcolor=#E9E9E9
| 37350 ||  || — || October 9, 2001 || Socorro || LINEAR || — || align=right | 5.0 km || 
|-id=351 bgcolor=#fefefe
| 37351 ||  || — || October 14, 2001 || Socorro || LINEAR || — || align=right | 3.9 km || 
|-id=352 bgcolor=#E9E9E9
| 37352 ||  || — || October 13, 2001 || Socorro || LINEAR || — || align=right | 4.7 km || 
|-id=353 bgcolor=#fefefe
| 37353 ||  || — || October 13, 2001 || Socorro || LINEAR || — || align=right | 5.5 km || 
|-id=354 bgcolor=#fefefe
| 37354 ||  || — || October 13, 2001 || Socorro || LINEAR || NYS || align=right | 6.5 km || 
|-id=355 bgcolor=#d6d6d6
| 37355 ||  || — || October 14, 2001 || Socorro || LINEAR || — || align=right | 5.2 km || 
|-id=356 bgcolor=#d6d6d6
| 37356 ||  || — || October 14, 2001 || Socorro || LINEAR || — || align=right | 8.4 km || 
|-id=357 bgcolor=#d6d6d6
| 37357 ||  || — || October 12, 2001 || Haleakala || NEAT || ALA || align=right | 10 km || 
|-id=358 bgcolor=#fefefe
| 37358 ||  || — || October 18, 2001 || Desert Eagle || W. K. Y. Yeung || NYS || align=right | 2.6 km || 
|-id=359 bgcolor=#FA8072
| 37359 ||  || — || October 25, 2001 || Desert Eagle || W. K. Y. Yeung || — || align=right | 2.4 km || 
|-id=360 bgcolor=#d6d6d6
| 37360 ||  || — || October 18, 2001 || Socorro || LINEAR || VER || align=right | 9.4 km || 
|-id=361 bgcolor=#d6d6d6
| 37361 ||  || — || October 17, 2001 || Socorro || LINEAR || KOR || align=right | 3.6 km || 
|-id=362 bgcolor=#fefefe
| 37362 ||  || — || October 18, 2001 || Socorro || LINEAR || — || align=right | 3.0 km || 
|-id=363 bgcolor=#fefefe
| 37363 ||  || — || October 19, 2001 || Haleakala || NEAT || — || align=right | 3.6 km || 
|-id=364 bgcolor=#fefefe
| 37364 ||  || — || October 22, 2001 || Socorro || LINEAR || V || align=right data-sort-value="0.93" | 930 m || 
|-id=365 bgcolor=#fefefe
| 37365 ||  || — || October 23, 2001 || Socorro || LINEAR || — || align=right | 5.1 km || 
|-id=366 bgcolor=#fefefe
| 37366 ||  || — || October 23, 2001 || Socorro || LINEAR || — || align=right | 2.4 km || 
|-id=367 bgcolor=#FA8072
| 37367 || 2001 VC || — || November 6, 2001 || Palomar || NEAT || — || align=right | 1.8 km || 
|-id=368 bgcolor=#E9E9E9
| 37368 || 2001 VR || — || November 7, 2001 || Socorro || LINEAR || — || align=right | 3.5 km || 
|-id=369 bgcolor=#E9E9E9
| 37369 || 2001 VV || — || November 6, 2001 || Socorro || LINEAR || MAR || align=right | 3.3 km || 
|-id=370 bgcolor=#E9E9E9
| 37370 ||  || — || November 9, 2001 || Socorro || LINEAR || — || align=right | 3.6 km || 
|-id=371 bgcolor=#E9E9E9
| 37371 ||  || — || November 9, 2001 || Socorro || LINEAR || — || align=right | 6.8 km || 
|-id=372 bgcolor=#E9E9E9
| 37372 ||  || — || November 9, 2001 || Socorro || LINEAR || — || align=right | 5.0 km || 
|-id=373 bgcolor=#E9E9E9
| 37373 ||  || — || November 9, 2001 || Socorro || LINEAR || — || align=right | 4.4 km || 
|-id=374 bgcolor=#d6d6d6
| 37374 ||  || — || November 9, 2001 || Socorro || LINEAR || THM || align=right | 7.7 km || 
|-id=375 bgcolor=#d6d6d6
| 37375 ||  || — || November 9, 2001 || Socorro || LINEAR || — || align=right | 12 km || 
|-id=376 bgcolor=#E9E9E9
| 37376 ||  || — || November 9, 2001 || Socorro || LINEAR || — || align=right | 4.9 km || 
|-id=377 bgcolor=#E9E9E9
| 37377 ||  || — || November 9, 2001 || Socorro || LINEAR || — || align=right | 3.7 km || 
|-id=378 bgcolor=#FA8072
| 37378 ||  || — || November 12, 2001 || Socorro || LINEAR || Hfast || align=right | 2.3 km || 
|-id=379 bgcolor=#d6d6d6
| 37379 ||  || — || November 15, 2001 || Socorro || LINEAR || — || align=right | 5.4 km || 
|-id=380 bgcolor=#d6d6d6
| 37380 ||  || — || November 15, 2001 || Socorro || LINEAR || — || align=right | 6.5 km || 
|-id=381 bgcolor=#fefefe
| 37381 ||  || — || November 12, 2001 || Socorro || LINEAR || NYS || align=right | 2.6 km || 
|-id=382 bgcolor=#fefefe
| 37382 ||  || — || November 12, 2001 || Socorro || LINEAR || V || align=right | 2.5 km || 
|-id=383 bgcolor=#E9E9E9
| 37383 ||  || — || November 13, 2001 || Haleakala || NEAT || GEF || align=right | 3.1 km || 
|-id=384 bgcolor=#FA8072
| 37384 ||  || — || November 18, 2001 || Socorro || LINEAR || unusual || align=right | 5.8 km || 
|-id=385 bgcolor=#d6d6d6
| 37385 ||  || — || November 17, 2001 || Socorro || LINEAR || — || align=right | 8.6 km || 
|-id=386 bgcolor=#fefefe
| 37386 ||  || — || November 17, 2001 || Socorro || LINEAR || — || align=right | 3.6 km || 
|-id=387 bgcolor=#E9E9E9
| 37387 ||  || — || November 17, 2001 || Socorro || LINEAR || — || align=right | 11 km || 
|-id=388 bgcolor=#d6d6d6
| 37388 ||  || — || November 17, 2001 || Socorro || LINEAR || — || align=right | 6.4 km || 
|-id=389 bgcolor=#E9E9E9
| 37389 ||  || — || November 17, 2001 || Socorro || LINEAR || — || align=right | 3.7 km || 
|-id=390 bgcolor=#E9E9E9
| 37390 ||  || — || November 30, 2001 || Kingsnake || J. V. McClusky || — || align=right | 8.0 km || 
|-id=391 bgcolor=#fefefe
| 37391 Ebre || 2001 XB ||  || December 1, 2001 || Ametlla de Mar || J. Nomen || — || align=right | 3.1 km || 
|-id=392 bgcolor=#fefefe
| 37392 Yukiniall ||  ||  || December 10, 2001 || Uccle || T. Pauwels, H. Boffin || — || align=right | 2.3 km || 
|-id=393 bgcolor=#fefefe
| 37393 ||  || — || December 10, 2001 || Socorro || LINEAR || — || align=right | 2.9 km || 
|-id=394 bgcolor=#fefefe
| 37394 ||  || — || December 10, 2001 || Socorro || LINEAR || — || align=right | 2.6 km || 
|-id=395 bgcolor=#fefefe
| 37395 ||  || — || December 11, 2001 || Socorro || LINEAR || — || align=right | 2.1 km || 
|-id=396 bgcolor=#E9E9E9
| 37396 ||  || — || December 9, 2001 || Socorro || LINEAR || GEF || align=right | 5.7 km || 
|-id=397 bgcolor=#E9E9E9
| 37397 ||  || — || December 9, 2001 || Socorro || LINEAR || — || align=right | 6.2 km || 
|-id=398 bgcolor=#d6d6d6
| 37398 ||  || — || December 10, 2001 || Socorro || LINEAR || — || align=right | 8.7 km || 
|-id=399 bgcolor=#fefefe
| 37399 ||  || — || December 10, 2001 || Socorro || LINEAR || NYS || align=right | 1.7 km || 
|-id=400 bgcolor=#d6d6d6
| 37400 ||  || — || December 10, 2001 || Socorro || LINEAR || THM || align=right | 8.7 km || 
|}

37401–37500 

|-bgcolor=#d6d6d6
| 37401 ||  || — || December 11, 2001 || Socorro || LINEAR || — || align=right | 12 km || 
|-id=402 bgcolor=#fefefe
| 37402 ||  || — || December 10, 2001 || Socorro || LINEAR || — || align=right | 1.9 km || 
|-id=403 bgcolor=#d6d6d6
| 37403 ||  || — || December 10, 2001 || Socorro || LINEAR || — || align=right | 12 km || 
|-id=404 bgcolor=#fefefe
| 37404 ||  || — || December 10, 2001 || Socorro || LINEAR || — || align=right | 2.6 km || 
|-id=405 bgcolor=#E9E9E9
| 37405 ||  || — || December 10, 2001 || Socorro || LINEAR || — || align=right | 4.8 km || 
|-id=406 bgcolor=#fefefe
| 37406 ||  || — || December 14, 2001 || Socorro || LINEAR || — || align=right | 2.9 km || 
|-id=407 bgcolor=#E9E9E9
| 37407 ||  || — || December 11, 2001 || Socorro || LINEAR || AER || align=right | 4.3 km || 
|-id=408 bgcolor=#d6d6d6
| 37408 ||  || — || December 13, 2001 || Socorro || LINEAR || — || align=right | 5.4 km || 
|-id=409 bgcolor=#fefefe
| 37409 ||  || — || December 13, 2001 || Socorro || LINEAR || — || align=right | 4.1 km || 
|-id=410 bgcolor=#fefefe
| 37410 ||  || — || December 13, 2001 || Socorro || LINEAR || FLO || align=right | 2.3 km || 
|-id=411 bgcolor=#d6d6d6
| 37411 ||  || — || December 14, 2001 || Socorro || LINEAR || KOR || align=right | 3.1 km || 
|-id=412 bgcolor=#fefefe
| 37412 ||  || — || December 14, 2001 || Socorro || LINEAR || MAS || align=right | 1.2 km || 
|-id=413 bgcolor=#E9E9E9
| 37413 ||  || — || December 14, 2001 || Socorro || LINEAR || MRX || align=right | 3.0 km || 
|-id=414 bgcolor=#d6d6d6
| 37414 ||  || — || December 14, 2001 || Socorro || LINEAR || — || align=right | 5.7 km || 
|-id=415 bgcolor=#fefefe
| 37415 ||  || — || December 14, 2001 || Socorro || LINEAR || NYS || align=right | 2.5 km || 
|-id=416 bgcolor=#d6d6d6
| 37416 ||  || — || December 14, 2001 || Socorro || LINEAR || — || align=right | 6.7 km || 
|-id=417 bgcolor=#fefefe
| 37417 ||  || — || December 14, 2001 || Socorro || LINEAR || — || align=right | 1.7 km || 
|-id=418 bgcolor=#fefefe
| 37418 ||  || — || December 14, 2001 || Socorro || LINEAR || NYS || align=right | 3.5 km || 
|-id=419 bgcolor=#d6d6d6
| 37419 ||  || — || December 14, 2001 || Socorro || LINEAR || — || align=right | 5.7 km || 
|-id=420 bgcolor=#d6d6d6
| 37420 ||  || — || December 14, 2001 || Socorro || LINEAR || TRE || align=right | 6.2 km || 
|-id=421 bgcolor=#d6d6d6
| 37421 ||  || — || December 14, 2001 || Socorro || LINEAR || HYG || align=right | 7.6 km || 
|-id=422 bgcolor=#fefefe
| 37422 ||  || — || December 13, 2001 || Socorro || LINEAR || FLO || align=right | 2.7 km || 
|-id=423 bgcolor=#fefefe
| 37423 ||  || — || December 14, 2001 || Socorro || LINEAR || NYS || align=right | 2.6 km || 
|-id=424 bgcolor=#E9E9E9
| 37424 ||  || — || December 19, 2001 || Fountain Hills || C. W. Juels || EUN || align=right | 5.9 km || 
|-id=425 bgcolor=#E9E9E9
| 37425 ||  || — || December 19, 2001 || Fountain Hills || C. W. Juels || — || align=right | 3.4 km || 
|-id=426 bgcolor=#d6d6d6
| 37426 ||  || — || December 18, 2001 || Socorro || LINEAR || EOS || align=right | 4.5 km || 
|-id=427 bgcolor=#fefefe
| 37427 ||  || — || December 18, 2001 || Socorro || LINEAR || — || align=right | 2.5 km || 
|-id=428 bgcolor=#fefefe
| 37428 ||  || — || December 17, 2001 || Palomar || NEAT || — || align=right | 2.4 km || 
|-id=429 bgcolor=#E9E9E9
| 37429 ||  || — || December 17, 2001 || Socorro || LINEAR || — || align=right | 4.6 km || 
|-id=430 bgcolor=#fefefe
| 37430 ||  || — || December 19, 2001 || Socorro || LINEAR || — || align=right | 6.7 km || 
|-id=431 bgcolor=#fefefe
| 37431 ||  || — || January 4, 2002 || Palomar || NEAT || — || align=right | 1.8 km || 
|-id=432 bgcolor=#fefefe
| 37432 Piszkéstető ||  ||  || January 11, 2002 || Piszkéstető || K. Sárneczky, Z. Heiner || ERI || align=right | 4.6 km || 
|-id=433 bgcolor=#E9E9E9
| 37433 ||  || — || January 8, 2002 || Haleakala || NEAT || — || align=right | 7.9 km || 
|-id=434 bgcolor=#d6d6d6
| 37434 ||  || — || January 8, 2002 || Palomar || NEAT || HYG || align=right | 8.0 km || 
|-id=435 bgcolor=#d6d6d6
| 37435 || 2111 P-L || — || September 24, 1960 || Palomar || PLS || — || align=right | 9.3 km || 
|-id=436 bgcolor=#d6d6d6
| 37436 || 2201 P-L || — || September 24, 1960 || Palomar || PLS || — || align=right | 6.3 km || 
|-id=437 bgcolor=#fefefe
| 37437 || 2576 P-L || — || September 24, 1960 || Palomar || PLS || — || align=right | 4.6 km || 
|-id=438 bgcolor=#E9E9E9
| 37438 || 2599 P-L || — || September 24, 1960 || Palomar || PLS || — || align=right | 4.3 km || 
|-id=439 bgcolor=#E9E9E9
| 37439 || 2610 P-L || — || September 24, 1960 || Palomar || PLS || — || align=right | 3.0 km || 
|-id=440 bgcolor=#d6d6d6
| 37440 || 2612 P-L || — || September 24, 1960 || Palomar || PLS || — || align=right | 5.7 km || 
|-id=441 bgcolor=#E9E9E9
| 37441 || 2700 P-L || — || September 24, 1960 || Palomar || PLS || — || align=right | 2.3 km || 
|-id=442 bgcolor=#E9E9E9
| 37442 || 2722 P-L || — || September 24, 1960 || Palomar || PLS || — || align=right | 7.6 km || 
|-id=443 bgcolor=#d6d6d6
| 37443 || 2788 P-L || — || September 26, 1960 || Palomar || PLS || THM || align=right | 5.9 km || 
|-id=444 bgcolor=#fefefe
| 37444 || 2793 P-L || — || September 26, 1960 || Palomar || PLS || — || align=right | 2.2 km || 
|-id=445 bgcolor=#fefefe
| 37445 || 3056 P-L || — || September 24, 1960 || Palomar || PLS || — || align=right | 2.7 km || 
|-id=446 bgcolor=#d6d6d6
| 37446 || 4067 P-L || — || September 24, 1960 || Palomar || PLS || — || align=right | 7.1 km || 
|-id=447 bgcolor=#E9E9E9
| 37447 || 4162 P-L || — || September 24, 1960 || Palomar || PLS || — || align=right | 2.1 km || 
|-id=448 bgcolor=#E9E9E9
| 37448 || 4218 P-L || — || September 24, 1960 || Palomar || PLS || — || align=right | 6.7 km || 
|-id=449 bgcolor=#fefefe
| 37449 || 4235 P-L || — || September 24, 1960 || Palomar || PLS || — || align=right | 1.4 km || 
|-id=450 bgcolor=#fefefe
| 37450 || 4257 P-L || — || September 24, 1960 || Palomar || PLS || V || align=right | 1.4 km || 
|-id=451 bgcolor=#E9E9E9
| 37451 || 4280 P-L || — || September 24, 1960 || Palomar || PLS || — || align=right | 2.1 km || 
|-id=452 bgcolor=#d6d6d6
| 37452 Spirit || 4282 P-L ||  || September 24, 1960 || Palomar || PLS || HIL3:2 || align=right | 8.9 km || 
|-id=453 bgcolor=#fefefe
| 37453 || 4311 P-L || — || September 24, 1960 || Palomar || PLS || — || align=right | 1.7 km || 
|-id=454 bgcolor=#d6d6d6
| 37454 || 4636 P-L || — || September 24, 1960 || Palomar || PLS || — || align=right | 10 km || 
|-id=455 bgcolor=#d6d6d6
| 37455 || 4727 P-L || — || September 24, 1960 || Palomar || PLS || — || align=right | 7.9 km || 
|-id=456 bgcolor=#E9E9E9
| 37456 || 4790 P-L || — || September 24, 1960 || Palomar || PLS || — || align=right | 3.8 km || 
|-id=457 bgcolor=#fefefe
| 37457 || 4793 P-L || — || September 24, 1960 || Palomar || PLS || EUT || align=right | 2.0 km || 
|-id=458 bgcolor=#fefefe
| 37458 || 5008 P-L || — || October 22, 1960 || Palomar || PLS || — || align=right | 2.0 km || 
|-id=459 bgcolor=#E9E9E9
| 37459 || 6037 P-L || — || September 24, 1960 || Palomar || PLS || — || align=right | 3.3 km || 
|-id=460 bgcolor=#fefefe
| 37460 || 6102 P-L || — || September 24, 1960 || Palomar || PLS || NYS || align=right | 1.4 km || 
|-id=461 bgcolor=#fefefe
| 37461 || 6112 P-L || — || September 24, 1960 || Palomar || PLS || NYS || align=right | 1.2 km || 
|-id=462 bgcolor=#E9E9E9
| 37462 || 6293 P-L || — || September 24, 1960 || Palomar || PLS || — || align=right | 2.5 km || 
|-id=463 bgcolor=#fefefe
| 37463 || 6338 P-L || — || September 24, 1960 || Palomar || PLS || V || align=right | 1.5 km || 
|-id=464 bgcolor=#d6d6d6
| 37464 || 6352 P-L || — || September 24, 1960 || Palomar || PLS || KOR || align=right | 3.3 km || 
|-id=465 bgcolor=#fefefe
| 37465 || 6618 P-L || — || September 24, 1960 || Palomar || PLS || MAS || align=right | 1.9 km || 
|-id=466 bgcolor=#fefefe
| 37466 || 6727 P-L || — || September 24, 1960 || Palomar || PLS || — || align=right | 3.6 km || 
|-id=467 bgcolor=#E9E9E9
| 37467 || 6753 P-L || — || September 24, 1960 || Palomar || PLS || HEN || align=right | 2.5 km || 
|-id=468 bgcolor=#fefefe
| 37468 || 6782 P-L || — || September 24, 1960 || Palomar || PLS || — || align=right | 1.9 km || 
|-id=469 bgcolor=#d6d6d6
| 37469 || 6833 P-L || — || September 24, 1960 || Palomar || PLS || — || align=right | 3.9 km || 
|-id=470 bgcolor=#d6d6d6
| 37470 || 6834 P-L || — || September 24, 1960 || Palomar || PLS || — || align=right | 8.3 km || 
|-id=471 bgcolor=#fefefe
| 37471 Popocatepetl || 7082 P-L ||  || October 17, 1960 || Palomar || PLS || H || align=right | 2.1 km || 
|-id=472 bgcolor=#d6d6d6
| 37472 || 7613 P-L || — || October 17, 1960 || Palomar || PLS || — || align=right | 11 km || 
|-id=473 bgcolor=#fefefe
| 37473 || 9066 P-L || — || September 24, 1960 || Palomar || PLS || FLO || align=right | 1.6 km || 
|-id=474 bgcolor=#E9E9E9
| 37474 || 9618 P-L || — || October 17, 1960 || Palomar || PLS || — || align=right | 4.3 km || 
|-id=475 bgcolor=#E9E9E9
| 37475 || 1038 T-1 || — || March 25, 1971 || Palomar || PLS || — || align=right | 2.7 km || 
|-id=476 bgcolor=#d6d6d6
| 37476 || 1107 T-1 || — || March 25, 1971 || Palomar || PLS || — || align=right | 4.6 km || 
|-id=477 bgcolor=#E9E9E9
| 37477 || 1110 T-1 || — || March 25, 1971 || Palomar || PLS || — || align=right | 5.9 km || 
|-id=478 bgcolor=#E9E9E9
| 37478 || 1120 T-1 || — || March 25, 1971 || Palomar || PLS || NEM || align=right | 5.2 km || 
|-id=479 bgcolor=#FA8072
| 37479 || 1130 T-1 || — || March 25, 1971 || Palomar || PLS || — || align=right | 1.4 km || 
|-id=480 bgcolor=#E9E9E9
| 37480 || 1149 T-1 || — || March 25, 1971 || Palomar || PLS || MRX || align=right | 2.3 km || 
|-id=481 bgcolor=#E9E9E9
| 37481 || 1209 T-1 || — || March 25, 1971 || Palomar || PLS || MRX || align=right | 2.8 km || 
|-id=482 bgcolor=#E9E9E9
| 37482 || 2114 T-1 || — || March 25, 1971 || Palomar || PLS || — || align=right | 3.8 km || 
|-id=483 bgcolor=#fefefe
| 37483 || 2125 T-1 || — || March 25, 1971 || Palomar || PLS || — || align=right | 2.4 km || 
|-id=484 bgcolor=#fefefe
| 37484 || 2174 T-1 || — || March 25, 1971 || Palomar || PLS || — || align=right | 2.1 km || 
|-id=485 bgcolor=#d6d6d6
| 37485 || 2211 T-1 || — || March 25, 1971 || Palomar || PLS || — || align=right | 8.2 km || 
|-id=486 bgcolor=#d6d6d6
| 37486 || 2282 T-1 || — || March 25, 1971 || Palomar || PLS || — || align=right | 5.3 km || 
|-id=487 bgcolor=#fefefe
| 37487 || 3150 T-1 || — || March 26, 1971 || Palomar || PLS || FLO || align=right | 2.3 km || 
|-id=488 bgcolor=#fefefe
| 37488 || 3203 T-1 || — || March 26, 1971 || Palomar || PLS || FLO || align=right | 1.7 km || 
|-id=489 bgcolor=#E9E9E9
| 37489 || 4396 T-1 || — || March 26, 1971 || Palomar || PLS || PAD || align=right | 5.3 km || 
|-id=490 bgcolor=#E9E9E9
| 37490 || 1082 T-2 || — || September 29, 1973 || Palomar || PLS || — || align=right | 6.1 km || 
|-id=491 bgcolor=#d6d6d6
| 37491 || 1112 T-2 || — || September 29, 1973 || Palomar || PLS || — || align=right | 5.1 km || 
|-id=492 bgcolor=#fefefe
| 37492 || 1115 T-2 || — || September 29, 1973 || Palomar || PLS || — || align=right | 1.7 km || 
|-id=493 bgcolor=#d6d6d6
| 37493 || 1171 T-2 || — || September 29, 1973 || Palomar || PLS || EOS || align=right | 6.3 km || 
|-id=494 bgcolor=#d6d6d6
| 37494 || 1174 T-2 || — || September 29, 1973 || Palomar || PLS || — || align=right | 7.0 km || 
|-id=495 bgcolor=#d6d6d6
| 37495 || 1226 T-2 || — || September 29, 1973 || Palomar || PLS || — || align=right | 6.2 km || 
|-id=496 bgcolor=#d6d6d6
| 37496 || 1287 T-2 || — || September 29, 1973 || Palomar || PLS || — || align=right | 5.7 km || 
|-id=497 bgcolor=#fefefe
| 37497 || 1330 T-2 || — || September 29, 1973 || Palomar || PLS || — || align=right | 3.0 km || 
|-id=498 bgcolor=#fefefe
| 37498 || 1507 T-2 || — || September 30, 1973 || Palomar || PLS || — || align=right | 3.8 km || 
|-id=499 bgcolor=#d6d6d6
| 37499 || 2033 T-2 || — || September 29, 1973 || Palomar || PLS || — || align=right | 7.3 km || 
|-id=500 bgcolor=#E9E9E9
| 37500 || 2118 T-2 || — || September 29, 1973 || Palomar || PLS || — || align=right | 5.1 km || 
|}

37501–37600 

|-bgcolor=#E9E9E9
| 37501 || 2130 T-2 || — || September 29, 1973 || Palomar || PLS || — || align=right | 5.4 km || 
|-id=502 bgcolor=#fefefe
| 37502 || 2257 T-2 || — || September 29, 1973 || Palomar || PLS || — || align=right | 3.5 km || 
|-id=503 bgcolor=#d6d6d6
| 37503 || 2288 T-2 || — || September 29, 1973 || Palomar || PLS || THM || align=right | 7.7 km || 
|-id=504 bgcolor=#d6d6d6
| 37504 || 3052 T-2 || — || September 30, 1973 || Palomar || PLS || — || align=right | 6.5 km || 
|-id=505 bgcolor=#d6d6d6
| 37505 || 3062 T-2 || — || September 30, 1973 || Palomar || PLS || — || align=right | 6.5 km || 
|-id=506 bgcolor=#d6d6d6
| 37506 || 3107 T-2 || — || September 30, 1973 || Palomar || PLS || — || align=right | 7.1 km || 
|-id=507 bgcolor=#fefefe
| 37507 || 3141 T-2 || — || September 30, 1973 || Palomar || PLS || NYS || align=right | 1.5 km || 
|-id=508 bgcolor=#E9E9E9
| 37508 || 3190 T-2 || — || September 30, 1973 || Palomar || PLS || GEF || align=right | 3.4 km || 
|-id=509 bgcolor=#d6d6d6
| 37509 || 3192 T-2 || — || September 30, 1973 || Palomar || PLS || — || align=right | 6.8 km || 
|-id=510 bgcolor=#d6d6d6
| 37510 || 3235 T-2 || — || September 30, 1973 || Palomar || PLS || — || align=right | 6.0 km || 
|-id=511 bgcolor=#fefefe
| 37511 || 3303 T-2 || — || September 30, 1973 || Palomar || PLS || NYS || align=right | 2.0 km || 
|-id=512 bgcolor=#fefefe
| 37512 || 4197 T-2 || — || September 29, 1973 || Palomar || PLS || — || align=right | 2.0 km || 
|-id=513 bgcolor=#E9E9E9
| 37513 || 5068 T-2 || — || September 25, 1973 || Palomar || PLS || JUN || align=right | 7.0 km || 
|-id=514 bgcolor=#d6d6d6
| 37514 || 1118 T-3 || — || October 17, 1977 || Palomar || PLS || VER || align=right | 7.2 km || 
|-id=515 bgcolor=#fefefe
| 37515 || 2008 T-3 || — || October 16, 1977 || Palomar || PLS || — || align=right | 2.0 km || 
|-id=516 bgcolor=#fefefe
| 37516 || 2027 T-3 || — || October 16, 1977 || Palomar || PLS || FLO || align=right | 2.2 km || 
|-id=517 bgcolor=#E9E9E9
| 37517 || 2134 T-3 || — || October 16, 1977 || Palomar || PLS || DOR || align=right | 6.0 km || 
|-id=518 bgcolor=#fefefe
| 37518 || 2410 T-3 || — || October 16, 1977 || Palomar || PLS || V || align=right | 3.4 km || 
|-id=519 bgcolor=#C2FFFF
| 37519 Amphios || 3040 T-3 ||  || October 16, 1977 || Palomar || PLS || L5010 || align=right | 33 km || 
|-id=520 bgcolor=#E9E9E9
| 37520 || 3193 T-3 || — || October 16, 1977 || Palomar || PLS || — || align=right | 6.4 km || 
|-id=521 bgcolor=#fefefe
| 37521 || 3280 T-3 || — || October 16, 1977 || Palomar || PLS || — || align=right | 2.3 km || 
|-id=522 bgcolor=#E9E9E9
| 37522 || 3367 T-3 || — || October 16, 1977 || Palomar || PLS || HEN || align=right | 3.0 km || 
|-id=523 bgcolor=#d6d6d6
| 37523 || 4076 T-3 || — || October 16, 1977 || Palomar || PLS || — || align=right | 10 km || 
|-id=524 bgcolor=#E9E9E9
| 37524 || 4375 T-3 || — || October 16, 1977 || Palomar || PLS || WIT || align=right | 2.8 km || 
|-id=525 bgcolor=#fefefe
| 37525 || 5127 T-3 || — || October 16, 1977 || Palomar || PLS || — || align=right | 2.9 km || 
|-id=526 bgcolor=#E9E9E9
| 37526 || 5721 T-3 || — || October 16, 1977 || Palomar || PLS || — || align=right | 6.5 km || 
|-id=527 bgcolor=#E9E9E9
| 37527 ||  || — || October 26, 1971 || Hamburg-Bergedorf || L. Kohoutek || — || align=right | 6.0 km || 
|-id=528 bgcolor=#d6d6d6
| 37528 || 1975 SX || — || September 30, 1975 || Palomar || S. J. Bus || 2:1J || align=right | 7.3 km || 
|-id=529 bgcolor=#E9E9E9
| 37529 ||  || — || March 12, 1977 || Kiso || H. Kosai, K. Furukawa || MIT || align=right | 5.1 km || 
|-id=530 bgcolor=#fefefe
| 37530 Dancingangel ||  ||  || September 11, 1977 || Nauchnij || N. S. Chernykh || — || align=right | 4.2 km || 
|-id=531 bgcolor=#fefefe
| 37531 ||  || — || November 7, 1978 || Palomar || E. F. Helin, S. J. Bus || NYS || align=right | 1.9 km || 
|-id=532 bgcolor=#d6d6d6
| 37532 ||  || — || November 6, 1978 || Palomar || E. F. Helin, S. J. Bus || TIR || align=right | 4.4 km || 
|-id=533 bgcolor=#d6d6d6
| 37533 ||  || — || June 25, 1979 || Siding Spring || E. F. Helin, S. J. Bus || KOR || align=right | 3.4 km || 
|-id=534 bgcolor=#E9E9E9
| 37534 ||  || — || March 16, 1980 || La Silla || C.-I. Lagerkvist || — || align=right | 6.1 km || 
|-id=535 bgcolor=#fefefe
| 37535 || 1981 DP || — || February 28, 1981 || Siding Spring || S. J. Bus || — || align=right | 2.4 km || 
|-id=536 bgcolor=#fefefe
| 37536 ||  || — || March 2, 1981 || Siding Spring || S. J. Bus || — || align=right | 1.5 km || 
|-id=537 bgcolor=#d6d6d6
| 37537 ||  || — || March 2, 1981 || Siding Spring || S. J. Bus || — || align=right | 12 km || 
|-id=538 bgcolor=#E9E9E9
| 37538 ||  || — || March 2, 1981 || Siding Spring || S. J. Bus || — || align=right | 3.0 km || 
|-id=539 bgcolor=#E9E9E9
| 37539 ||  || — || March 2, 1981 || Siding Spring || S. J. Bus || — || align=right | 4.6 km || 
|-id=540 bgcolor=#fefefe
| 37540 ||  || — || March 1, 1981 || Siding Spring || S. J. Bus || — || align=right | 2.1 km || 
|-id=541 bgcolor=#E9E9E9
| 37541 ||  || — || March 1, 1981 || Siding Spring || S. J. Bus || ADE || align=right | 5.6 km || 
|-id=542 bgcolor=#d6d6d6
| 37542 ||  || — || March 1, 1981 || Siding Spring || S. J. Bus || — || align=right | 5.4 km || 
|-id=543 bgcolor=#E9E9E9
| 37543 ||  || — || March 1, 1981 || Siding Spring || S. J. Bus || — || align=right | 4.1 km || 
|-id=544 bgcolor=#fefefe
| 37544 ||  || — || March 6, 1981 || Siding Spring || S. J. Bus || FLO || align=right | 1.9 km || 
|-id=545 bgcolor=#d6d6d6
| 37545 ||  || — || March 2, 1981 || Siding Spring || S. J. Bus || — || align=right | 4.0 km || 
|-id=546 bgcolor=#E9E9E9
| 37546 ||  || — || March 2, 1981 || Siding Spring || S. J. Bus || — || align=right | 3.6 km || 
|-id=547 bgcolor=#E9E9E9
| 37547 ||  || — || March 2, 1981 || Siding Spring || S. J. Bus || — || align=right | 3.5 km || 
|-id=548 bgcolor=#E9E9E9
| 37548 ||  || — || March 2, 1981 || Siding Spring || S. J. Bus || — || align=right | 2.9 km || 
|-id=549 bgcolor=#fefefe
| 37549 ||  || — || March 2, 1981 || Siding Spring || S. J. Bus || V || align=right | 1.5 km || 
|-id=550 bgcolor=#fefefe
| 37550 ||  || — || March 2, 1981 || Siding Spring || S. J. Bus || PHO || align=right | 2.2 km || 
|-id=551 bgcolor=#E9E9E9
| 37551 ||  || — || March 2, 1981 || Siding Spring || S. J. Bus || — || align=right | 2.5 km || 
|-id=552 bgcolor=#E9E9E9
| 37552 ||  || — || March 2, 1981 || Siding Spring || S. J. Bus || — || align=right | 2.8 km || 
|-id=553 bgcolor=#d6d6d6
| 37553 ||  || — || March 3, 1981 || Siding Spring || S. J. Bus || — || align=right | 5.6 km || 
|-id=554 bgcolor=#fefefe
| 37554 ||  || — || March 7, 1981 || Siding Spring || S. J. Bus || — || align=right | 1.4 km || 
|-id=555 bgcolor=#E9E9E9
| 37555 ||  || — || March 2, 1981 || Siding Spring || S. J. Bus || — || align=right | 2.4 km || 
|-id=556 bgcolor=#fefefe
| 37556 Svyaztie ||  ||  || August 28, 1982 || Nauchnij || N. S. Chernykh, B. G. Marsden || — || align=right | 4.0 km || 
|-id=557 bgcolor=#fefefe
| 37557 || 1984 JR || — || May 9, 1984 || Palomar || J. Gibson || NYS || align=right | 1.7 km || 
|-id=558 bgcolor=#d6d6d6
| 37558 ||  || — || September 22, 1984 || La Silla || H. Debehogne || — || align=right | 9.8 km || 
|-id=559 bgcolor=#fefefe
| 37559 || 1985 UR || — || October 20, 1985 || Kleť || A. Mrkos || — || align=right | 6.2 km || 
|-id=560 bgcolor=#fefefe
| 37560 ||  || — || August 29, 1986 || La Silla || H. Debehogne || FLO || align=right | 2.5 km || 
|-id=561 bgcolor=#fefefe
| 37561 Churgym || 1988 CR ||  || February 13, 1988 || La Silla || E. W. Elst || H || align=right | 1.5 km || 
|-id=562 bgcolor=#fefefe
| 37562 || 1988 MA || — || June 16, 1988 || Palomar || E. F. Helin || PHO || align=right | 3.5 km || 
|-id=563 bgcolor=#fefefe
| 37563 ||  || — || September 16, 1988 || Cerro Tololo || S. J. Bus || — || align=right | 3.7 km || 
|-id=564 bgcolor=#d6d6d6
| 37564 ||  || — || October 13, 1988 || Kushiro || S. Ueda, H. Kaneda || — || align=right | 9.5 km || 
|-id=565 bgcolor=#E9E9E9
| 37565 ||  || — || November 3, 1988 || Kitami || T. Fujii, K. Watanabe || — || align=right | 6.0 km || 
|-id=566 bgcolor=#E9E9E9
| 37566 ||  || — || April 3, 1989 || La Silla || E. W. Elst || GEF || align=right | 4.8 km || 
|-id=567 bgcolor=#fefefe
| 37567 ||  || — || September 26, 1989 || La Silla || E. W. Elst || — || align=right | 4.3 km || 
|-id=568 bgcolor=#FA8072
| 37568 || 1989 TP || — || October 4, 1989 || Palomar || E. F. Helin || — || align=right | 2.2 km || 
|-id=569 bgcolor=#fefefe
| 37569 || 1989 UG || — || October 23, 1989 || Gekko || Y. Oshima || — || align=right | 7.1 km || 
|-id=570 bgcolor=#fefefe
| 37570 ||  || — || October 25, 1989 || Gekko || Y. Oshima || V || align=right | 2.2 km || 
|-id=571 bgcolor=#fefefe
| 37571 ||  || — || October 25, 1989 || Gekko || Y. Oshima || NYS || align=right | 2.0 km || 
|-id=572 bgcolor=#C2FFFF
| 37572 ||  || — || October 30, 1989 || Cerro Tololo || S. J. Bus || L5 || align=right | 12 km || 
|-id=573 bgcolor=#fefefe
| 37573 Enricocaruso ||  ||  || October 23, 1989 || Tautenburg Observatory || F. Börngen || NYS || align=right | 2.2 km || 
|-id=574 bgcolor=#E9E9E9
| 37574 ||  || — || August 25, 1990 || Palomar || H. E. Holt || — || align=right | 7.3 km || 
|-id=575 bgcolor=#E9E9E9
| 37575 ||  || — || August 20, 1990 || La Silla || E. W. Elst || MRX || align=right | 5.0 km || 
|-id=576 bgcolor=#E9E9E9
| 37576 ||  || — || August 24, 1990 || Palomar || H. E. Holt || — || align=right | 3.7 km || 
|-id=577 bgcolor=#fefefe
| 37577 || 1990 RG || — || September 14, 1990 || Palomar || H. E. Holt || — || align=right | 1.7 km || 
|-id=578 bgcolor=#d6d6d6
| 37578 ||  || — || September 15, 1990 || Palomar || H. E. Holt || 3:2 || align=right | 13 km || 
|-id=579 bgcolor=#E9E9E9
| 37579 ||  || — || September 22, 1990 || La Silla || E. W. Elst || — || align=right | 5.6 km || 
|-id=580 bgcolor=#fefefe
| 37580 ||  || — || September 22, 1990 || La Silla || E. W. Elst || FLO || align=right | 3.4 km || 
|-id=581 bgcolor=#E9E9E9
| 37581 ||  || — || September 16, 1990 || Palomar || H. E. Holt || — || align=right | 4.5 km || 
|-id=582 bgcolor=#fefefe
| 37582 Faraday ||  ||  || October 12, 1990 || Tautenburg Observatory || F. Börngen, L. D. Schmadel || — || align=right | 2.2 km || 
|-id=583 bgcolor=#fefefe
| 37583 Ramonkhanna ||  ||  || October 13, 1990 || Tautenburg Observatory || L. D. Schmadel, F. Börngen || — || align=right | 4.6 km || 
|-id=584 bgcolor=#fefefe
| 37584 Schleiden ||  ||  || October 10, 1990 || Tautenburg Observatory || F. Börngen, L. D. Schmadel || — || align=right | 3.3 km || 
|-id=585 bgcolor=#fefefe
| 37585 ||  || — || November 15, 1990 || La Silla || E. W. Elst || V || align=right | 2.3 km || 
|-id=586 bgcolor=#fefefe
| 37586 ||  || — || January 23, 1991 || Kushiro || M. Matsuyama, K. Watanabe || PHOslow || align=right | 5.0 km || 
|-id=587 bgcolor=#d6d6d6
| 37587 ||  || — || February 14, 1991 || Palomar || E. F. Helin || — || align=right | 8.3 km || 
|-id=588 bgcolor=#fefefe
| 37588 Lynnecox ||  ||  || April 15, 1991 || Palomar || C. S. Shoemaker, D. H. Levy || — || align=right | 3.8 km || 
|-id=589 bgcolor=#E9E9E9
| 37589 ||  || — || July 9, 1991 || Palomar || E. F. Helin, K. J. Lawrence || RAF || align=right | 4.3 km || 
|-id=590 bgcolor=#d6d6d6
| 37590 ||  || — || September 13, 1991 || Palomar || H. E. Holt || HIL3:2 || align=right | 15 km || 
|-id=591 bgcolor=#E9E9E9
| 37591 ||  || — || October 10, 1991 || Palomar || K. J. Lawrence || — || align=right | 6.1 km || 
|-id=592 bgcolor=#E9E9E9
| 37592 Pauljackson ||  ||  || October 3, 1991 || Tautenburg Observatory || L. D. Schmadel, F. Börngen || — || align=right | 3.4 km || 
|-id=593 bgcolor=#E9E9E9
| 37593 || 1991 UJ || — || October 18, 1991 || Kushiro || S. Ueda, H. Kaneda || — || align=right | 5.8 km || 
|-id=594 bgcolor=#E9E9E9
| 37594 ||  || — || October 29, 1991 || Kitt Peak || Spacewatch || NEM || align=right | 5.1 km || 
|-id=595 bgcolor=#d6d6d6
| 37595 ||  || — || October 29, 1991 || Kushiro || S. Ueda, H. Kaneda || EOS || align=right | 7.3 km || 
|-id=596 bgcolor=#FA8072
| 37596 Cotahuasi ||  ||  || November 9, 1991 || La Silla || E. W. Elst || — || align=right | 2.1 km || 
|-id=597 bgcolor=#d6d6d6
| 37597 ||  || — || March 2, 1992 || La Silla || UESAC || THM || align=right | 7.0 km || 
|-id=598 bgcolor=#fefefe
| 37598 ||  || — || March 2, 1992 || La Silla || UESAC || — || align=right | 2.9 km || 
|-id=599 bgcolor=#d6d6d6
| 37599 ||  || — || March 3, 1992 || La Silla || UESAC || — || align=right | 11 km || 
|-id=600 bgcolor=#d6d6d6
| 37600 ||  || — || March 2, 1992 || La Silla || UESAC || — || align=right | 3.3 km || 
|}

37601–37700 

|-bgcolor=#fefefe
| 37601 Vicjen ||  ||  || April 3, 1992 || Palomar || C. S. Shoemaker, D. H. Levy || PHO || align=right | 3.9 km || 
|-id=602 bgcolor=#d6d6d6
| 37602 ||  || — || April 24, 1992 || Kitt Peak || Spacewatch || — || align=right | 5.8 km || 
|-id=603 bgcolor=#fefefe
| 37603 ||  || — || April 24, 1992 || Kitt Peak || Spacewatch || FLO || align=right | 4.0 km || 
|-id=604 bgcolor=#fefefe
| 37604 ||  || — || July 26, 1992 || La Silla || E. W. Elst || — || align=right | 2.2 km || 
|-id=605 bgcolor=#fefefe
| 37605 ||  || — || August 2, 1992 || Palomar || H. E. Holt || V || align=right | 3.0 km || 
|-id=606 bgcolor=#fefefe
| 37606 ||  || — || September 2, 1992 || La Silla || E. W. Elst || — || align=right | 2.6 km || 
|-id=607 bgcolor=#fefefe
| 37607 Regineolsen ||  ||  || September 2, 1992 || La Silla || E. W. Elst || — || align=right | 3.3 km || 
|-id=608 bgcolor=#E9E9E9
| 37608 Löns ||  ||  || September 24, 1992 || Tautenburg Observatory || F. Börngen, L. D. Schmadel || — || align=right | 4.0 km || 
|-id=609 bgcolor=#E9E9E9
| 37609 LaVelle ||  ||  || November 25, 1992 || Palomar || E. M. Shoemaker, C. S. Shoemaker || — || align=right | 2.9 km || 
|-id=610 bgcolor=#E9E9E9
| 37610 ||  || — || March 17, 1993 || La Silla || UESAC || — || align=right | 5.5 km || 
|-id=611 bgcolor=#E9E9E9
| 37611 ||  || — || March 21, 1993 || La Silla || UESAC || GEF || align=right | 6.3 km || 
|-id=612 bgcolor=#E9E9E9
| 37612 ||  || — || March 19, 1993 || La Silla || UESAC || — || align=right | 6.8 km || 
|-id=613 bgcolor=#E9E9E9
| 37613 ||  || — || March 19, 1993 || La Silla || UESAC || — || align=right | 4.0 km || 
|-id=614 bgcolor=#E9E9E9
| 37614 ||  || — || March 19, 1993 || La Silla || UESAC || AGN || align=right | 3.0 km || 
|-id=615 bgcolor=#E9E9E9
| 37615 ||  || — || March 19, 1993 || La Silla || UESAC || MRX || align=right | 3.3 km || 
|-id=616 bgcolor=#E9E9E9
| 37616 ||  || — || March 19, 1993 || La Silla || UESAC || — || align=right | 5.6 km || 
|-id=617 bgcolor=#fefefe
| 37617 ||  || — || July 12, 1993 || La Silla || E. W. Elst || — || align=right | 3.9 km || 
|-id=618 bgcolor=#d6d6d6
| 37618 ||  || — || July 20, 1993 || La Silla || E. W. Elst || EOS || align=right | 6.7 km || 
|-id=619 bgcolor=#d6d6d6
| 37619 ||  || — || July 20, 1993 || La Silla || E. W. Elst || — || align=right | 5.3 km || 
|-id=620 bgcolor=#d6d6d6
| 37620 ||  || — || August 16, 1993 || Caussols || E. W. Elst || — || align=right | 7.6 km || 
|-id=621 bgcolor=#fefefe
| 37621 ||  || — || August 18, 1993 || Caussols || E. W. Elst || — || align=right | 2.0 km || 
|-id=622 bgcolor=#fefefe
| 37622 ||  || — || August 20, 1993 || La Silla || E. W. Elst || NYS || align=right | 1.7 km || 
|-id=623 bgcolor=#d6d6d6
| 37623 Valmiera ||  ||  || September 15, 1993 || La Silla || E. W. Elst || ALA || align=right | 12 km || 
|-id=624 bgcolor=#fefefe
| 37624 ||  || — || September 14, 1993 || La Silla || H. Debehogne, E. W. Elst || NYS || align=right | 1.7 km || 
|-id=625 bgcolor=#fefefe
| 37625 ||  || — || September 16, 1993 || Kitami || K. Endate, K. Watanabe || — || align=right | 6.3 km || 
|-id=626 bgcolor=#fefefe
| 37626 ||  || — || September 19, 1993 || Kitami || K. Endate, K. Watanabe || FLO || align=right | 3.3 km || 
|-id=627 bgcolor=#fefefe
| 37627 Lucaparmitano || 1993 TD ||  || October 11, 1993 || Colleverde || V. S. Casulli || — || align=right | 3.1 km || 
|-id=628 bgcolor=#d6d6d6
| 37628 ||  || — || October 9, 1993 || La Silla || E. W. Elst || ALA || align=right | 11 km || 
|-id=629 bgcolor=#fefefe
| 37629 ||  || — || October 9, 1993 || La Silla || E. W. Elst || NYS || align=right | 3.2 km || 
|-id=630 bgcolor=#fefefe
| 37630 Thomasmore ||  ||  || October 9, 1993 || La Silla || E. W. Elst || — || align=right | 2.8 km || 
|-id=631 bgcolor=#fefefe
| 37631 ||  || — || October 9, 1993 || La Silla || E. W. Elst || FLO || align=right | 1.7 km || 
|-id=632 bgcolor=#fefefe
| 37632 ||  || — || October 9, 1993 || La Silla || E. W. Elst || V || align=right | 1.8 km || 
|-id=633 bgcolor=#fefefe
| 37633 ||  || — || October 9, 1993 || La Silla || E. W. Elst || NYS || align=right | 1.8 km || 
|-id=634 bgcolor=#fefefe
| 37634 || 1993 UZ || — || October 19, 1993 || Palomar || E. F. Helin || H || align=right | 1.7 km || 
|-id=635 bgcolor=#fefefe
| 37635 ||  || — || October 20, 1993 || Palomar || E. F. Helin || Hslow || align=right | 2.8 km || 
|-id=636 bgcolor=#fefefe
| 37636 ||  || — || October 20, 1993 || La Silla || E. W. Elst || NYS || align=right | 2.5 km || 
|-id=637 bgcolor=#fefefe
| 37637 ||  || — || October 20, 1993 || La Silla || E. W. Elst || — || align=right | 2.2 km || 
|-id=638 bgcolor=#FFC2E0
| 37638 || 1993 VB || — || November 6, 1993 || Siding Spring || R. H. McNaught || APOPHAcritical || align=right data-sort-value="0.49" | 490 m || 
|-id=639 bgcolor=#fefefe
| 37639 ||  || — || November 11, 1993 || Kushiro || S. Ueda, H. Kaneda || FLO || align=right | 4.2 km || 
|-id=640 bgcolor=#fefefe
| 37640 Luiginegrelli || 1993 WF ||  || November 20, 1993 || Colleverde || V. S. Casulli || V || align=right | 2.7 km || 
|-id=641 bgcolor=#fefefe
| 37641 ||  || — || January 15, 1994 || Oizumi || T. Kobayashi || NYS || align=right | 2.6 km || 
|-id=642 bgcolor=#fefefe
| 37642 ||  || — || January 6, 1994 || Kitt Peak || Spacewatch || MAS || align=right | 1.5 km || 
|-id=643 bgcolor=#fefefe
| 37643 ||  || — || January 7, 1994 || Kitt Peak || Spacewatch || EUT || align=right | 2.6 km || 
|-id=644 bgcolor=#fefefe
| 37644 ||  || — || January 16, 1994 || Caussols || E. W. Elst, C. Pollas || NYS || align=right | 3.2 km || 
|-id=645 bgcolor=#fefefe
| 37645 Chebarkul ||  ||  || February 8, 1994 || La Silla || E. W. Elst || V || align=right | 3.0 km || 
|-id=646 bgcolor=#fefefe
| 37646 Falconscott ||  ||  || February 8, 1994 || La Silla || E. W. Elst || — || align=right | 3.7 km || 
|-id=647 bgcolor=#E9E9E9
| 37647 ||  || — || March 15, 1994 || Oizumi || T. Kobayashi || EUN || align=right | 6.0 km || 
|-id=648 bgcolor=#fefefe
| 37648 ||  || — || March 9, 1994 || Caussols || E. W. Elst || — || align=right | 2.2 km || 
|-id=649 bgcolor=#E9E9E9
| 37649 || 1994 FC || — || March 19, 1994 || Siding Spring || R. H. McNaught || — || align=right | 3.3 km || 
|-id=650 bgcolor=#fefefe
| 37650 || 1994 FP || — || March 21, 1994 || Siding Spring || R. H. McNaught || PHO || align=right | 2.7 km || 
|-id=651 bgcolor=#fefefe
| 37651 || 1994 GX || — || April 3, 1994 || Siding Spring || G. J. Garradd || H || align=right | 1.3 km || 
|-id=652 bgcolor=#E9E9E9
| 37652 ||  || — || May 4, 1994 || Catalina Station || C. W. Hergenrother, T. B. Spahr || — || align=right | 3.6 km || 
|-id=653 bgcolor=#E9E9E9
| 37653 ||  || — || May 3, 1994 || Kitt Peak || Spacewatch || — || align=right | 2.8 km || 
|-id=654 bgcolor=#E9E9E9
| 37654 ||  || — || May 4, 1994 || Kitt Peak || Spacewatch || — || align=right | 3.1 km || 
|-id=655 bgcolor=#FFC2E0
| 37655 Illapa || 1994 PM ||  || August 1, 1994 || Palomar || C. S. Shoemaker, E. M. Shoemaker || APO +1kmPHA || align=right data-sort-value="0.97" | 970 m || 
|-id=656 bgcolor=#d6d6d6
| 37656 ||  || — || August 10, 1994 || La Silla || E. W. Elst || EOS || align=right | 4.1 km || 
|-id=657 bgcolor=#d6d6d6
| 37657 ||  || — || August 10, 1994 || La Silla || E. W. Elst || EOS || align=right | 4.0 km || 
|-id=658 bgcolor=#d6d6d6
| 37658 ||  || — || August 12, 1994 || La Silla || E. W. Elst || — || align=right | 5.4 km || 
|-id=659 bgcolor=#d6d6d6
| 37659 ||  || — || August 12, 1994 || La Silla || E. W. Elst || — || align=right | 6.0 km || 
|-id=660 bgcolor=#E9E9E9
| 37660 ||  || — || August 12, 1994 || La Silla || E. W. Elst || — || align=right | 4.8 km || 
|-id=661 bgcolor=#d6d6d6
| 37661 ||  || — || August 12, 1994 || La Silla || E. W. Elst || THM || align=right | 4.9 km || 
|-id=662 bgcolor=#d6d6d6
| 37662 ||  || — || August 12, 1994 || La Silla || E. W. Elst || KOR || align=right | 4.1 km || 
|-id=663 bgcolor=#d6d6d6
| 37663 ||  || — || August 12, 1994 || La Silla || E. W. Elst || EOS || align=right | 4.0 km || 
|-id=664 bgcolor=#d6d6d6
| 37664 ||  || — || August 10, 1994 || La Silla || E. W. Elst || — || align=right | 6.9 km || 
|-id=665 bgcolor=#d6d6d6
| 37665 ||  || — || September 3, 1994 || La Silla || E. W. Elst || KOR || align=right | 3.4 km || 
|-id=666 bgcolor=#d6d6d6
| 37666 ||  || — || September 28, 1994 || Kitt Peak || Spacewatch || — || align=right | 5.0 km || 
|-id=667 bgcolor=#d6d6d6
| 37667 ||  || — || September 28, 1994 || Kitt Peak || Spacewatch || — || align=right | 4.7 km || 
|-id=668 bgcolor=#d6d6d6
| 37668 ||  || — || September 28, 1994 || Kitt Peak || Spacewatch || EOS || align=right | 4.6 km || 
|-id=669 bgcolor=#d6d6d6
| 37669 ||  || — || October 2, 1994 || Kitami || K. Endate, K. Watanabe || SAN || align=right | 7.0 km || 
|-id=670 bgcolor=#fefefe
| 37670 ||  || — || October 10, 1994 || Kitt Peak || Spacewatch || — || align=right | 3.8 km || 
|-id=671 bgcolor=#FA8072
| 37671 ||  || — || October 31, 1994 || Palomar || PCAS || PHO || align=right | 3.0 km || 
|-id=672 bgcolor=#fefefe
| 37672 || 1994 VC || — || November 1, 1994 || Oizumi || T. Kobayashi || — || align=right | 2.3 km || 
|-id=673 bgcolor=#fefefe
| 37673 ||  || — || November 28, 1994 || Kitt Peak || Spacewatch || — || align=right | 2.0 km || 
|-id=674 bgcolor=#d6d6d6
| 37674 ||  || — || December 2, 1994 || Kitt Peak || Spacewatch || HYG || align=right | 4.8 km || 
|-id=675 bgcolor=#fefefe
| 37675 ||  || — || January 6, 1995 || Nyukasa || M. Hirasawa, S. Suzuki || — || align=right | 3.1 km || 
|-id=676 bgcolor=#fefefe
| 37676 ||  || — || January 29, 1995 || Kitt Peak || Spacewatch || — || align=right | 1.9 km || 
|-id=677 bgcolor=#fefefe
| 37677 ||  || — || February 3, 1995 || Oizumi || T. Kobayashi || FLO || align=right | 2.6 km || 
|-id=678 bgcolor=#fefefe
| 37678 McClure ||  ||  || February 3, 1995 || Siding Spring || D. J. Asher || PHO || align=right | 2.4 km || 
|-id=679 bgcolor=#fefefe
| 37679 ||  || — || February 22, 1995 || Kitt Peak || Spacewatch || — || align=right | 1.5 km || 
|-id=680 bgcolor=#fefefe
| 37680 ||  || — || March 23, 1995 || Kitt Peak || Spacewatch || — || align=right | 1.8 km || 
|-id=681 bgcolor=#fefefe
| 37681 ||  || — || March 23, 1995 || Kitt Peak || Spacewatch || NYS || align=right | 1.3 km || 
|-id=682 bgcolor=#fefefe
| 37682 ||  || — || April 4, 1995 || Xinglong || SCAP || FLO || align=right | 2.9 km || 
|-id=683 bgcolor=#fefefe
| 37683 Gustaveeiffel || 1995 KK ||  || May 19, 1995 || Colleverde || V. S. Casulli || — || align=right | 2.2 km || 
|-id=684 bgcolor=#fefefe
| 37684 || 1995 NE || — || July 1, 1995 || Kitt Peak || Spacewatch || — || align=right | 1.8 km || 
|-id=685 bgcolor=#C2FFFF
| 37685 ||  || — || July 22, 1995 || Kitt Peak || Spacewatch || L4 || align=right | 22 km || 
|-id=686 bgcolor=#E9E9E9
| 37686 ||  || — || July 22, 1995 || Kitt Peak || Spacewatch || — || align=right | 4.7 km || 
|-id=687 bgcolor=#E9E9E9
| 37687 Chunghikoh ||  ||  || August 30, 1995 || Socorro || R. Weber || MAR || align=right | 3.9 km || 
|-id=688 bgcolor=#E9E9E9
| 37688 ||  || — || September 18, 1995 || Kitt Peak || Spacewatch || — || align=right | 3.0 km || 
|-id=689 bgcolor=#E9E9E9
| 37689 ||  || — || September 27, 1995 || Kitt Peak || Spacewatch || — || align=right | 3.4 km || 
|-id=690 bgcolor=#E9E9E9
| 37690 ||  || — || October 17, 1995 || Kitt Peak || Spacewatch || — || align=right | 2.9 km || 
|-id=691 bgcolor=#E9E9E9
| 37691 ||  || — || October 21, 1995 || Kitt Peak || Spacewatch || — || align=right | 6.3 km || 
|-id=692 bgcolor=#d6d6d6
| 37692 Loribragg || 1995 VX ||  || November 12, 1995 || Haleakala || AMOS || — || align=right | 5.1 km || 
|-id=693 bgcolor=#E9E9E9
| 37693 ||  || — || November 15, 1995 || Kitami || K. Endate, K. Watanabe || — || align=right | 4.7 km || 
|-id=694 bgcolor=#E9E9E9
| 37694 ||  || — || November 26, 1995 || Kleť || Kleť Obs. || — || align=right | 5.7 km || 
|-id=695 bgcolor=#d6d6d6
| 37695 ||  || — || November 16, 1995 || Kitt Peak || Spacewatch || KOR || align=right | 2.1 km || 
|-id=696 bgcolor=#d6d6d6
| 37696 ||  || — || November 18, 1995 || Kitt Peak || Spacewatch || MEL || align=right | 5.4 km || 
|-id=697 bgcolor=#d6d6d6
| 37697 ||  || — || December 16, 1995 || Kitt Peak || Spacewatch || — || align=right | 5.4 km || 
|-id=698 bgcolor=#d6d6d6
| 37698 ||  || — || December 18, 1995 || Kitt Peak || Spacewatch || KOR || align=right | 4.0 km || 
|-id=699 bgcolor=#d6d6d6
| 37699 Santini-Aichl ||  ||  || January 13, 1996 || Kleť || J. Tichá, M. Tichý || — || align=right | 7.7 km || 
|-id=700 bgcolor=#d6d6d6
| 37700 ||  || — || January 10, 1996 || Haleakala || AMOS || — || align=right | 7.4 km || 
|}

37701–37800 

|-bgcolor=#d6d6d6
| 37701 ||  || — || January 13, 1996 || Kitt Peak || Spacewatch || VER || align=right | 7.7 km || 
|-id=702 bgcolor=#d6d6d6
| 37702 ||  || — || January 20, 1996 || Kitt Peak || Spacewatch || — || align=right | 6.7 km || 
|-id=703 bgcolor=#fefefe
| 37703 ||  || — || February 11, 1996 || Xinglong || SCAP || H || align=right | 1.5 km || 
|-id=704 bgcolor=#d6d6d6
| 37704 ||  || — || March 12, 1996 || Kitt Peak || Spacewatch || — || align=right | 7.5 km || 
|-id=705 bgcolor=#fefefe
| 37705 ||  || — || April 15, 1996 || La Silla || E. W. Elst || — || align=right | 2.2 km || 
|-id=706 bgcolor=#fefefe
| 37706 Trinchieri || 1996 RN ||  || September 8, 1996 || Sormano || V. Giuliani, P. Chiavenna || FLO || align=right | 2.4 km || 
|-id=707 bgcolor=#fefefe
| 37707 ||  || — || September 15, 1996 || Prescott || P. G. Comba || — || align=right | 1.9 km || 
|-id=708 bgcolor=#fefefe
| 37708 ||  || — || September 13, 1996 || Haleakala || NEAT || — || align=right | 2.2 km || 
|-id=709 bgcolor=#E9E9E9
| 37709 ||  || — || September 12, 1996 || Haleakala || NEAT || — || align=right | 2.9 km || 
|-id=710 bgcolor=#C2FFFF
| 37710 ||  || — || September 8, 1996 || Kitt Peak || Spacewatch || L4 || align=right | 18 km || 
|-id=711 bgcolor=#fefefe
| 37711 ||  || — || September 8, 1996 || Kitt Peak || Spacewatch || V || align=right | 2.0 km || 
|-id=712 bgcolor=#fefefe
| 37712 ||  || — || September 8, 1996 || Kitt Peak || Spacewatch || V || align=right | 1.6 km || 
|-id=713 bgcolor=#fefefe
| 37713 ||  || — || September 13, 1996 || Kitt Peak || Spacewatch || — || align=right | 1.5 km || 
|-id=714 bgcolor=#C2FFFF
| 37714 ||  || — || September 11, 1996 || La Silla || UDTS || L4 || align=right | 14 km || 
|-id=715 bgcolor=#C2FFFF
| 37715 ||  || — || September 13, 1996 || La Silla || UDTS || L4 || align=right | 19 km || 
|-id=716 bgcolor=#C2FFFF
| 37716 ||  || — || September 15, 1996 || La Silla || UDTS || L4 || align=right | 15 km || 
|-id=717 bgcolor=#fefefe
| 37717 ||  || — || September 11, 1996 || La Silla || C.-I. Lagerkvist || PHO || align=right | 5.4 km || 
|-id=718 bgcolor=#fefefe
| 37718 ||  || — || September 20, 1996 || Xinglong || SCAP || FLO || align=right | 1.8 km || 
|-id=719 bgcolor=#fefefe
| 37719 ||  || — || September 18, 1996 || Xinglong || SCAP || NYS || align=right | 2.5 km || 
|-id=720 bgcolor=#fefefe
| 37720 Kawanishi ||  ||  || September 23, 1996 || Nanyo || T. Okuni || NYS || align=right | 3.7 km || 
|-id=721 bgcolor=#fefefe
| 37721 ||  || — || October 10, 1996 || Catalina Station || T. B. Spahr || — || align=right | 2.8 km || 
|-id=722 bgcolor=#E9E9E9
| 37722 ||  || — || October 12, 1996 || Farra d'Isonzo || Farra d'Isonzo || — || align=right | 3.1 km || 
|-id=723 bgcolor=#fefefe
| 37723 ||  || — || October 7, 1996 || Kitt Peak || Spacewatch || — || align=right | 2.6 km || 
|-id=724 bgcolor=#fefefe
| 37724 ||  || — || October 7, 1996 || Kitt Peak || Spacewatch || NYS || align=right | 2.3 km || 
|-id=725 bgcolor=#fefefe
| 37725 ||  || — || October 11, 1996 || Kitt Peak || Spacewatch || FLO || align=right | 2.2 km || 
|-id=726 bgcolor=#fefefe
| 37726 ||  || — || October 12, 1996 || Kitt Peak || Spacewatch || — || align=right | 4.3 km || 
|-id=727 bgcolor=#fefefe
| 37727 ||  || — || October 8, 1996 || La Silla || E. W. Elst || V || align=right | 1.6 km || 
|-id=728 bgcolor=#fefefe
| 37728 ||  || — || October 8, 1996 || La Silla || E. W. Elst || ERI || align=right | 5.5 km || 
|-id=729 bgcolor=#E9E9E9
| 37729 Akiratakao ||  ||  || October 14, 1996 || Geisei || T. Seki || ADE || align=right | 7.2 km || 
|-id=730 bgcolor=#fefefe
| 37730 ||  || — || October 10, 1996 || Xinglong || SCAP || — || align=right | 3.2 km || 
|-id=731 bgcolor=#E9E9E9
| 37731 ||  || — || October 5, 1996 || Xinglong || SCAP || — || align=right | 1.9 km || 
|-id=732 bgcolor=#C2FFFF
| 37732 ||  || — || October 10, 1996 || La Silla || C.-I. Lagerkvist || L4 || align=right | 21 km || 
|-id=733 bgcolor=#fefefe
| 37733 ||  || — || October 16, 1996 || Church Stretton || S. P. Laurie || FLO || align=right | 2.6 km || 
|-id=734 bgcolor=#fefefe
| 37734 Bonacina ||  ||  || October 30, 1996 || Sormano || A. Testa, V. Giuliani || FLO || align=right | 2.3 km || 
|-id=735 bgcolor=#fefefe
| 37735 Riccardomuti || 1996 VL ||  || November 1, 1996 || Colleverde || V. S. Casulli || ERI || align=right | 2.2 km || 
|-id=736 bgcolor=#E9E9E9
| 37736 Jandl ||  ||  || November 15, 1996 || Kleť || J. Tichá, M. Tichý || — || align=right | 3.2 km || 
|-id=737 bgcolor=#E9E9E9
| 37737 ||  || — || November 5, 1996 || Kitt Peak || Spacewatch || — || align=right | 2.0 km || 
|-id=738 bgcolor=#fefefe
| 37738 ||  || — || November 5, 1996 || Kitt Peak || Spacewatch || — || align=right | 2.7 km || 
|-id=739 bgcolor=#E9E9E9
| 37739 ||  || — || November 5, 1996 || Kitt Peak || Spacewatch || — || align=right | 3.2 km || 
|-id=740 bgcolor=#fefefe
| 37740 ||  || — || November 7, 1996 || Kushiro || S. Ueda, H. Kaneda || — || align=right | 3.2 km || 
|-id=741 bgcolor=#E9E9E9
| 37741 ||  || — || November 30, 1996 || Oizumi || T. Kobayashi || — || align=right | 3.6 km || 
|-id=742 bgcolor=#E9E9E9
| 37742 ||  || — || November 30, 1996 || Dossobuono || L. Lai || MIS || align=right | 5.0 km || 
|-id=743 bgcolor=#E9E9E9
| 37743 || 1996 XQ || — || December 1, 1996 || Chichibu || N. Satō || — || align=right | 2.1 km || 
|-id=744 bgcolor=#fefefe
| 37744 ||  || — || December 8, 1996 || Catalina Station || C. W. Hergenrother || H || align=right | 2.3 km || 
|-id=745 bgcolor=#E9E9E9
| 37745 ||  || — || December 8, 1996 || Kitt Peak || Spacewatch || GEF || align=right | 3.3 km || 
|-id=746 bgcolor=#E9E9E9
| 37746 ||  || — || December 14, 1996 || Chichibu || N. Satō || — || align=right | 5.1 km || 
|-id=747 bgcolor=#d6d6d6
| 37747 || 1996 YS || — || December 20, 1996 || Oizumi || T. Kobayashi || — || align=right | 8.6 km || 
|-id=748 bgcolor=#E9E9E9
| 37748 ||  || — || January 3, 1997 || Oizumi || T. Kobayashi || — || align=right | 3.5 km || 
|-id=749 bgcolor=#E9E9E9
| 37749 Umbertobonori ||  ||  || January 12, 1997 || Bologna || San Vittore Obs. || — || align=right | 5.1 km || 
|-id=750 bgcolor=#E9E9E9
| 37750 || 1997 BZ || — || January 19, 1997 || Xinglong || SCAP || ADE || align=right | 10 km || 
|-id=751 bgcolor=#E9E9E9
| 37751 ||  || — || February 1, 1997 || Oizumi || T. Kobayashi || — || align=right | 9.3 km || 
|-id=752 bgcolor=#d6d6d6
| 37752 ||  || — || February 3, 1997 || Kitt Peak || Spacewatch || — || align=right | 3.9 km || 
|-id=753 bgcolor=#d6d6d6
| 37753 ||  || — || February 7, 1997 || Kleť || Kleť Obs. || KOR || align=right | 3.4 km || 
|-id=754 bgcolor=#d6d6d6
| 37754 ||  || — || February 6, 1997 || Kitt Peak || Spacewatch || — || align=right | 5.9 km || 
|-id=755 bgcolor=#d6d6d6
| 37755 || 1997 EA || — || March 1, 1997 || Oizumi || T. Kobayashi || — || align=right | 7.0 km || 
|-id=756 bgcolor=#E9E9E9
| 37756 ||  || — || March 3, 1997 || Farra d'Isonzo || Farra d'Isonzo || — || align=right | 5.6 km || 
|-id=757 bgcolor=#E9E9E9
| 37757 ||  || — || March 4, 1997 || Kitt Peak || Spacewatch || — || align=right | 4.3 km || 
|-id=758 bgcolor=#E9E9E9
| 37758 ||  || — || March 4, 1997 || Socorro || LINEAR || — || align=right | 4.0 km || 
|-id=759 bgcolor=#E9E9E9
| 37759 ||  || — || March 4, 1997 || Socorro || LINEAR || GEF || align=right | 3.6 km || 
|-id=760 bgcolor=#E9E9E9
| 37760 ||  || — || March 10, 1997 || Socorro || LINEAR || GEF || align=right | 5.2 km || 
|-id=761 bgcolor=#d6d6d6
| 37761 ||  || — || March 5, 1997 || La Silla || E. W. Elst || THM || align=right | 7.6 km || 
|-id=762 bgcolor=#d6d6d6
| 37762 ||  || — || April 2, 1997 || Kitt Peak || Spacewatch || — || align=right | 5.7 km || 
|-id=763 bgcolor=#d6d6d6
| 37763 ||  || — || April 7, 1997 || Kitt Peak || Spacewatch || EOS || align=right | 4.5 km || 
|-id=764 bgcolor=#d6d6d6
| 37764 ||  || — || April 2, 1997 || Kitami || K. Endate, K. Watanabe || EOS || align=right | 7.8 km || 
|-id=765 bgcolor=#d6d6d6
| 37765 ||  || — || April 3, 1997 || Socorro || LINEAR || HYG || align=right | 7.0 km || 
|-id=766 bgcolor=#d6d6d6
| 37766 ||  || — || April 3, 1997 || Socorro || LINEAR || — || align=right | 5.1 km || 
|-id=767 bgcolor=#d6d6d6
| 37767 ||  || — || April 3, 1997 || Socorro || LINEAR || — || align=right | 3.6 km || 
|-id=768 bgcolor=#d6d6d6
| 37768 ||  || — || April 3, 1997 || Socorro || LINEAR || EOS || align=right | 5.8 km || 
|-id=769 bgcolor=#d6d6d6
| 37769 ||  || — || April 3, 1997 || Socorro || LINEAR || ALA || align=right | 10 km || 
|-id=770 bgcolor=#d6d6d6
| 37770 ||  || — || April 6, 1997 || Socorro || LINEAR || HYG || align=right | 4.7 km || 
|-id=771 bgcolor=#d6d6d6
| 37771 ||  || — || April 6, 1997 || Socorro || LINEAR || — || align=right | 12 km || 
|-id=772 bgcolor=#d6d6d6
| 37772 ||  || — || April 6, 1997 || Socorro || LINEAR || ALA || align=right | 12 km || 
|-id=773 bgcolor=#d6d6d6
| 37773 ||  || — || April 7, 1997 || Goodricke-Pigott || M. T. Chamberlin || — || align=right | 5.8 km || 
|-id=774 bgcolor=#d6d6d6
| 37774 ||  || — || April 7, 1997 || Kitt Peak || Spacewatch || — || align=right | 4.0 km || 
|-id=775 bgcolor=#d6d6d6
| 37775 ||  || — || April 7, 1997 || Kitt Peak || Spacewatch || THM || align=right | 7.6 km || 
|-id=776 bgcolor=#fefefe
| 37776 ||  || — || April 8, 1997 || Kitt Peak || Spacewatch || V || align=right | 1.5 km || 
|-id=777 bgcolor=#d6d6d6
| 37777 ||  || — || April 12, 1997 || Majorca || Á. López J., R. Pacheco || — || align=right | 7.5 km || 
|-id=778 bgcolor=#d6d6d6
| 37778 ||  || — || April 29, 1997 || Kitt Peak || Spacewatch || — || align=right | 6.7 km || 
|-id=779 bgcolor=#d6d6d6
| 37779 ||  || — || April 30, 1997 || Socorro || LINEAR || — || align=right | 5.9 km || 
|-id=780 bgcolor=#d6d6d6
| 37780 ||  || — || April 30, 1997 || Socorro || LINEAR || HYG || align=right | 6.6 km || 
|-id=781 bgcolor=#d6d6d6
| 37781 ||  || — || April 30, 1997 || Socorro || LINEAR || — || align=right | 11 km || 
|-id=782 bgcolor=#d6d6d6
| 37782 Jacquespiccard ||  ||  || May 3, 1997 || La Silla || E. W. Elst || — || align=right | 6.1 km || 
|-id=783 bgcolor=#E9E9E9
| 37783 ||  || — || June 28, 1997 || Socorro || LINEAR || — || align=right | 4.2 km || 
|-id=784 bgcolor=#fefefe
| 37784 ||  || — || September 23, 1997 || Farra d'Isonzo || Farra d'Isonzo || FLO || align=right | 1.8 km || 
|-id=785 bgcolor=#fefefe
| 37785 Nougaro ||  ||  || September 27, 1997 || Caussols || ODAS || — || align=right | 2.0 km || 
|-id=786 bgcolor=#fefefe
| 37786 Tokikonaruko ||  ||  || September 30, 1997 || Moriyama || Y. Ikari || FLO || align=right | 1.4 km || 
|-id=787 bgcolor=#fefefe
| 37787 ||  || — || September 30, 1997 || Kitt Peak || Spacewatch || FLO || align=right | 1.7 km || 
|-id=788 bgcolor=#fefefe
| 37788 Suchan ||  ||  || September 25, 1997 || Ondřejov || Ondřejov Obs. || NYS || align=right | 1.4 km || 
|-id=789 bgcolor=#C2FFFF
| 37789 ||  || — || October 23, 1997 || Kitt Peak || Spacewatch || L4 || align=right | 15 km || 
|-id=790 bgcolor=#C2FFFF
| 37790 ||  || — || October 27, 1997 || La Silla || UDTS || L4 || align=right | 13 km || 
|-id=791 bgcolor=#fefefe
| 37791 ||  || — || November 7, 1997 || Prescott || P. G. Comba || — || align=right | 2.5 km || 
|-id=792 bgcolor=#fefefe
| 37792 ||  || — || November 2, 1997 || Xinglong || SCAP || — || align=right | 1.8 km || 
|-id=793 bgcolor=#fefefe
| 37793 || 1997 WE || — || November 18, 1997 || Oizumi || T. Kobayashi || — || align=right | 2.6 km || 
|-id=794 bgcolor=#fefefe
| 37794 ||  || — || November 19, 1997 || Nachi-Katsuura || Y. Shimizu, T. Urata || — || align=right | 2.3 km || 
|-id=795 bgcolor=#fefefe
| 37795 ||  || — || November 24, 1997 || Oizumi || T. Kobayashi || — || align=right | 2.1 km || 
|-id=796 bgcolor=#fefefe
| 37796 ||  || — || November 24, 1997 || Nachi-Katsuura || Y. Shimizu, T. Urata || FLO || align=right | 3.9 km || 
|-id=797 bgcolor=#fefefe
| 37797 ||  || — || November 23, 1997 || Kitt Peak || Spacewatch || — || align=right | 1.8 km || 
|-id=798 bgcolor=#fefefe
| 37798 ||  || — || November 28, 1997 || Kitt Peak || Spacewatch || — || align=right | 1.1 km || 
|-id=799 bgcolor=#fefefe
| 37799 ||  || — || November 29, 1997 || Socorro || LINEAR || — || align=right | 2.4 km || 
|-id=800 bgcolor=#fefefe
| 37800 ||  || — || November 29, 1997 || Socorro || LINEAR || — || align=right | 1.9 km || 
|}

37801–37900 

|-bgcolor=#fefefe
| 37801 ||  || — || November 19, 1997 || Xinglong || SCAP || — || align=right | 5.1 km || 
|-id=802 bgcolor=#FA8072
| 37802 ||  || — || December 3, 1997 || Kitt Peak || Spacewatch || — || align=right | 2.7 km || 
|-id=803 bgcolor=#fefefe
| 37803 || 1997 YY || — || December 20, 1997 || Oizumi || T. Kobayashi || FLO || align=right | 2.1 km || 
|-id=804 bgcolor=#fefefe
| 37804 ||  || — || December 23, 1997 || Xinglong || SCAP || — || align=right | 3.1 km || 
|-id=805 bgcolor=#fefefe
| 37805 ||  || — || December 28, 1997 || Oizumi || T. Kobayashi || — || align=right | 3.3 km || 
|-id=806 bgcolor=#fefefe
| 37806 ||  || — || December 30, 1997 || Oizumi || T. Kobayashi || — || align=right | 3.3 km || 
|-id=807 bgcolor=#fefefe
| 37807 ||  || — || December 27, 1997 || Kitt Peak || Spacewatch || FLO || align=right | 1.6 km || 
|-id=808 bgcolor=#fefefe
| 37808 ||  || — || December 31, 1997 || Oizumi || T. Kobayashi || — || align=right | 5.6 km || 
|-id=809 bgcolor=#fefefe
| 37809 ||  || — || December 29, 1997 || Kitt Peak || Spacewatch || NYS || align=right | 1.6 km || 
|-id=810 bgcolor=#fefefe
| 37810 ||  || — || December 31, 1997 || Kitt Peak || Spacewatch || — || align=right | 1.9 km || 
|-id=811 bgcolor=#fefefe
| 37811 ||  || — || January 6, 1998 || Kitt Peak || Spacewatch || — || align=right | 2.6 km || 
|-id=812 bgcolor=#fefefe
| 37812 ||  || — || January 8, 1998 || Caussols || ODAS || NYS || align=right | 2.5 km || 
|-id=813 bgcolor=#fefefe
| 37813 ||  || — || January 4, 1998 || Xinglong || SCAP || — || align=right | 2.5 km || 
|-id=814 bgcolor=#fefefe
| 37814 ||  || — || January 4, 1998 || Xinglong || SCAP || V || align=right | 2.2 km || 
|-id=815 bgcolor=#fefefe
| 37815 ||  || — || January 19, 1998 || Oizumi || T. Kobayashi || NYS || align=right | 2.3 km || 
|-id=816 bgcolor=#fefefe
| 37816 ||  || — || January 19, 1998 || Nachi-Katsuura || Y. Shimizu, T. Urata || — || align=right | 4.4 km || 
|-id=817 bgcolor=#fefefe
| 37817 ||  || — || January 19, 1998 || Nachi-Katsuura || Y. Shimizu, T. Urata || MAS || align=right | 3.1 km || 
|-id=818 bgcolor=#fefefe
| 37818 Juliamaury ||  ||  || January 18, 1998 || Caussols || ODAS || FLO || align=right | 1.6 km || 
|-id=819 bgcolor=#fefefe
| 37819 ||  || — || January 20, 1998 || Woomera || F. B. Zoltowski || — || align=right | 2.2 km || 
|-id=820 bgcolor=#fefefe
| 37820 ||  || — || January 25, 1998 || Oizumi || T. Kobayashi || — || align=right | 7.0 km || 
|-id=821 bgcolor=#fefefe
| 37821 ||  || — || January 25, 1998 || Oizumi || T. Kobayashi || — || align=right | 3.3 km || 
|-id=822 bgcolor=#fefefe
| 37822 ||  || — || January 25, 1998 || Oizumi || T. Kobayashi || — || align=right | 1.9 km || 
|-id=823 bgcolor=#fefefe
| 37823 ||  || — || January 25, 1998 || Oizumi || T. Kobayashi || NYS || align=right | 3.5 km || 
|-id=824 bgcolor=#fefefe
| 37824 ||  || — || January 25, 1998 || Nachi-Katsuura || Y. Shimizu, T. Urata || V || align=right | 2.9 km || 
|-id=825 bgcolor=#fefefe
| 37825 ||  || — || January 22, 1998 || Kitt Peak || Spacewatch || MAS || align=right | 2.5 km || 
|-id=826 bgcolor=#fefefe
| 37826 ||  || — || January 28, 1998 || Oizumi || T. Kobayashi || — || align=right | 2.5 km || 
|-id=827 bgcolor=#E9E9E9
| 37827 ||  || — || January 29, 1998 || Caussols || ODAS || — || align=right | 3.5 km || 
|-id=828 bgcolor=#fefefe
| 37828 ||  || — || January 31, 1998 || Oizumi || T. Kobayashi || V || align=right | 3.7 km || 
|-id=829 bgcolor=#fefefe
| 37829 ||  || — || January 31, 1998 || Oizumi || T. Kobayashi || FLO || align=right | 2.4 km || 
|-id=830 bgcolor=#fefefe
| 37830 ||  || — || January 31, 1998 || Oizumi || T. Kobayashi || PHO || align=right | 4.4 km || 
|-id=831 bgcolor=#fefefe
| 37831 ||  || — || January 27, 1998 || Uccle || E. W. Elst || — || align=right | 3.1 km || 
|-id=832 bgcolor=#fefefe
| 37832 ||  || — || January 29, 1998 || Kitt Peak || Spacewatch || — || align=right | 3.2 km || 
|-id=833 bgcolor=#fefefe
| 37833 ||  || — || January 29, 1998 || Kitt Peak || Spacewatch || — || align=right | 3.4 km || 
|-id=834 bgcolor=#fefefe
| 37834 ||  || — || January 25, 1998 || Haleakala || NEAT || — || align=right | 2.5 km || 
|-id=835 bgcolor=#fefefe
| 37835 Darioconsigli ||  ||  || January 25, 1998 || Cima Ekar || U. Munari, M. Tombelli || ERI || align=right | 5.2 km || 
|-id=836 bgcolor=#fefefe
| 37836 Simoneterreni ||  ||  || January 25, 1998 || Cima Ekar || U. Munari, M. Tombelli || V || align=right | 2.3 km || 
|-id=837 bgcolor=#E9E9E9
| 37837 ||  || — || February 9, 1998 || Xinglong || SCAP || — || align=right | 3.6 km || 
|-id=838 bgcolor=#fefefe
| 37838 || 1998 DF || — || February 17, 1998 || Bédoin || P. Antonini || FLO || align=right | 2.9 km || 
|-id=839 bgcolor=#fefefe
| 37839 ||  || — || February 19, 1998 || Farra d'Isonzo || Farra d'Isonzo || — || align=right | 2.1 km || 
|-id=840 bgcolor=#fefefe
| 37840 Gramegna ||  ||  || February 20, 1998 || Bologna || San Vittore Obs. || — || align=right | 2.4 km || 
|-id=841 bgcolor=#fefefe
| 37841 ||  || — || February 22, 1998 || Haleakala || NEAT || — || align=right | 3.7 km || 
|-id=842 bgcolor=#fefefe
| 37842 ||  || — || February 22, 1998 || Haleakala || NEAT || V || align=right | 2.2 km || 
|-id=843 bgcolor=#fefefe
| 37843 ||  || — || February 22, 1998 || Haleakala || NEAT || NYS || align=right | 3.0 km || 
|-id=844 bgcolor=#fefefe
| 37844 ||  || — || February 22, 1998 || Haleakala || NEAT || NYS || align=right | 2.1 km || 
|-id=845 bgcolor=#fefefe
| 37845 ||  || — || February 22, 1998 || Haleakala || NEAT || FLO || align=right | 3.4 km || 
|-id=846 bgcolor=#fefefe
| 37846 ||  || — || February 17, 1998 || Kitt Peak || Spacewatch || V || align=right | 2.2 km || 
|-id=847 bgcolor=#E9E9E9
| 37847 ||  || — || February 22, 1998 || Haleakala || NEAT || — || align=right | 3.3 km || 
|-id=848 bgcolor=#E9E9E9
| 37848 Michelmeunier ||  ||  || February 27, 1998 || Caussols || ODAS || — || align=right | 3.7 km || 
|-id=849 bgcolor=#fefefe
| 37849 ||  || — || February 22, 1998 || Kitt Peak || Spacewatch || — || align=right | 2.8 km || 
|-id=850 bgcolor=#E9E9E9
| 37850 ||  || — || February 22, 1998 || Kitt Peak || Spacewatch || — || align=right | 3.1 km || 
|-id=851 bgcolor=#fefefe
| 37851 ||  || — || February 24, 1998 || Kitt Peak || Spacewatch || NYS || align=right | 1.8 km || 
|-id=852 bgcolor=#fefefe
| 37852 ||  || — || February 22, 1998 || Xinglong || SCAP || FLO || align=right | 2.1 km || 
|-id=853 bgcolor=#fefefe
| 37853 Danielbarbier ||  ||  || February 27, 1998 || La Silla || E. W. Elst || NYS || align=right | 6.1 km || 
|-id=854 bgcolor=#fefefe
| 37854 ||  || — || March 1, 1998 || La Silla || E. W. Elst || fast? || align=right | 3.6 km || 
|-id=855 bgcolor=#fefefe
| 37855 ||  || — || March 1, 1998 || La Silla || E. W. Elst || FLO || align=right | 3.6 km || 
|-id=856 bgcolor=#fefefe
| 37856 ||  || — || March 1, 1998 || La Silla || E. W. Elst || NYS || align=right | 2.7 km || 
|-id=857 bgcolor=#E9E9E9
| 37857 ||  || — || March 5, 1998 || Reedy Creek || J. Broughton || — || align=right | 3.7 km || 
|-id=858 bgcolor=#fefefe
| 37858 ||  || — || March 3, 1998 || Socorro || LINEAR || V || align=right | 2.1 km || 
|-id=859 bgcolor=#E9E9E9
| 37859 Bobkoff ||  ||  || March 23, 1998 || Ondřejov || P. Pravec || — || align=right | 6.3 km || 
|-id=860 bgcolor=#E9E9E9
| 37860 ||  || — || March 23, 1998 || Kitt Peak || Spacewatch || HNS || align=right | 3.6 km || 
|-id=861 bgcolor=#E9E9E9
| 37861 ||  || — || March 23, 1998 || Prescott || P. G. Comba || — || align=right | 3.8 km || 
|-id=862 bgcolor=#E9E9E9
| 37862 ||  || — || March 24, 1998 || Prescott || P. G. Comba || — || align=right | 2.3 km || 
|-id=863 bgcolor=#E9E9E9
| 37863 ||  || — || March 20, 1998 || Kitt Peak || Spacewatch || — || align=right | 3.9 km || 
|-id=864 bgcolor=#E9E9E9
| 37864 ||  || — || March 24, 1998 || Caussols || ODAS || — || align=right | 2.3 km || 
|-id=865 bgcolor=#E9E9E9
| 37865 Georgesattard ||  ||  || March 28, 1998 || Caussols || ODAS || — || align=right | 3.1 km || 
|-id=866 bgcolor=#E9E9E9
| 37866 ||  || — || March 28, 1998 || Caussols || ODAS || — || align=right | 5.4 km || 
|-id=867 bgcolor=#fefefe
| 37867 ||  || — || March 20, 1998 || Socorro || LINEAR || MAS || align=right | 2.7 km || 
|-id=868 bgcolor=#fefefe
| 37868 ||  || — || March 20, 1998 || Socorro || LINEAR || NYS || align=right | 2.5 km || 
|-id=869 bgcolor=#E9E9E9
| 37869 ||  || — || March 20, 1998 || Socorro || LINEAR || — || align=right | 3.6 km || 
|-id=870 bgcolor=#fefefe
| 37870 ||  || — || March 20, 1998 || Socorro || LINEAR || MAS || align=right | 2.8 km || 
|-id=871 bgcolor=#fefefe
| 37871 ||  || — || March 20, 1998 || Socorro || LINEAR || — || align=right | 3.8 km || 
|-id=872 bgcolor=#E9E9E9
| 37872 ||  || — || March 20, 1998 || Socorro || LINEAR || — || align=right | 2.0 km || 
|-id=873 bgcolor=#E9E9E9
| 37873 ||  || — || March 20, 1998 || Socorro || LINEAR || — || align=right | 3.0 km || 
|-id=874 bgcolor=#fefefe
| 37874 ||  || — || March 20, 1998 || Socorro || LINEAR || — || align=right | 5.6 km || 
|-id=875 bgcolor=#fefefe
| 37875 ||  || — || March 20, 1998 || Socorro || LINEAR || V || align=right | 2.9 km || 
|-id=876 bgcolor=#E9E9E9
| 37876 ||  || — || March 20, 1998 || Socorro || LINEAR || — || align=right | 3.5 km || 
|-id=877 bgcolor=#E9E9E9
| 37877 ||  || — || March 20, 1998 || Socorro || LINEAR || — || align=right | 3.3 km || 
|-id=878 bgcolor=#E9E9E9
| 37878 ||  || — || March 20, 1998 || Socorro || LINEAR || — || align=right | 4.9 km || 
|-id=879 bgcolor=#E9E9E9
| 37879 ||  || — || March 20, 1998 || Socorro || LINEAR || — || align=right | 3.3 km || 
|-id=880 bgcolor=#E9E9E9
| 37880 ||  || — || March 20, 1998 || Socorro || LINEAR || — || align=right | 3.1 km || 
|-id=881 bgcolor=#E9E9E9
| 37881 ||  || — || March 20, 1998 || Socorro || LINEAR || — || align=right | 2.8 km || 
|-id=882 bgcolor=#fefefe
| 37882 ||  || — || March 20, 1998 || Socorro || LINEAR || — || align=right | 2.6 km || 
|-id=883 bgcolor=#E9E9E9
| 37883 ||  || — || March 20, 1998 || Socorro || LINEAR || MAR || align=right | 2.9 km || 
|-id=884 bgcolor=#E9E9E9
| 37884 ||  || — || March 20, 1998 || Socorro || LINEAR || — || align=right | 4.2 km || 
|-id=885 bgcolor=#E9E9E9
| 37885 ||  || — || March 20, 1998 || Socorro || LINEAR || RAF || align=right | 3.9 km || 
|-id=886 bgcolor=#E9E9E9
| 37886 ||  || — || March 20, 1998 || Socorro || LINEAR || — || align=right | 2.7 km || 
|-id=887 bgcolor=#E9E9E9
| 37887 ||  || — || March 20, 1998 || Socorro || LINEAR || — || align=right | 2.6 km || 
|-id=888 bgcolor=#E9E9E9
| 37888 ||  || — || March 20, 1998 || Socorro || LINEAR || — || align=right | 3.3 km || 
|-id=889 bgcolor=#E9E9E9
| 37889 ||  || — || March 20, 1998 || Socorro || LINEAR || MAR || align=right | 2.6 km || 
|-id=890 bgcolor=#E9E9E9
| 37890 ||  || — || March 20, 1998 || Socorro || LINEAR || — || align=right | 2.7 km || 
|-id=891 bgcolor=#E9E9E9
| 37891 ||  || — || March 20, 1998 || Socorro || LINEAR || — || align=right | 4.0 km || 
|-id=892 bgcolor=#E9E9E9
| 37892 ||  || — || March 20, 1998 || Socorro || LINEAR || MAR || align=right | 3.6 km || 
|-id=893 bgcolor=#E9E9E9
| 37893 ||  || — || March 20, 1998 || Socorro || LINEAR || — || align=right | 3.9 km || 
|-id=894 bgcolor=#E9E9E9
| 37894 ||  || — || March 20, 1998 || Socorro || LINEAR || — || align=right | 5.1 km || 
|-id=895 bgcolor=#E9E9E9
| 37895 ||  || — || March 20, 1998 || Socorro || LINEAR || — || align=right | 4.8 km || 
|-id=896 bgcolor=#d6d6d6
| 37896 ||  || — || March 20, 1998 || Socorro || LINEAR || EOS || align=right | 5.8 km || 
|-id=897 bgcolor=#E9E9E9
| 37897 ||  || — || March 20, 1998 || Socorro || LINEAR || — || align=right | 7.7 km || 
|-id=898 bgcolor=#E9E9E9
| 37898 ||  || — || March 20, 1998 || Socorro || LINEAR || — || align=right | 4.3 km || 
|-id=899 bgcolor=#E9E9E9
| 37899 ||  || — || March 20, 1998 || Socorro || LINEAR || — || align=right | 2.4 km || 
|-id=900 bgcolor=#E9E9E9
| 37900 ||  || — || March 20, 1998 || Socorro || LINEAR || — || align=right | 2.6 km || 
|}

37901–38000 

|-bgcolor=#E9E9E9
| 37901 ||  || — || March 20, 1998 || Socorro || LINEAR || DOR || align=right | 6.2 km || 
|-id=902 bgcolor=#fefefe
| 37902 ||  || — || March 20, 1998 || Socorro || LINEAR || — || align=right | 2.9 km || 
|-id=903 bgcolor=#E9E9E9
| 37903 ||  || — || March 20, 1998 || Socorro || LINEAR || — || align=right | 3.0 km || 
|-id=904 bgcolor=#E9E9E9
| 37904 ||  || — || March 20, 1998 || Socorro || LINEAR || ADE || align=right | 7.0 km || 
|-id=905 bgcolor=#E9E9E9
| 37905 ||  || — || March 20, 1998 || Socorro || LINEAR || HNS || align=right | 3.5 km || 
|-id=906 bgcolor=#fefefe
| 37906 ||  || — || March 28, 1998 || Stroncone || Santa Lucia Obs. || — || align=right | 3.7 km || 
|-id=907 bgcolor=#E9E9E9
| 37907 ||  || — || March 24, 1998 || Socorro || LINEAR || — || align=right | 4.4 km || 
|-id=908 bgcolor=#E9E9E9
| 37908 ||  || — || March 24, 1998 || Socorro || LINEAR || — || align=right | 4.0 km || 
|-id=909 bgcolor=#E9E9E9
| 37909 ||  || — || March 24, 1998 || Socorro || LINEAR || — || align=right | 3.3 km || 
|-id=910 bgcolor=#E9E9E9
| 37910 ||  || — || March 24, 1998 || Socorro || LINEAR || — || align=right | 3.8 km || 
|-id=911 bgcolor=#E9E9E9
| 37911 ||  || — || March 24, 1998 || Socorro || LINEAR || — || align=right | 3.8 km || 
|-id=912 bgcolor=#E9E9E9
| 37912 ||  || — || March 24, 1998 || Socorro || LINEAR || — || align=right | 4.3 km || 
|-id=913 bgcolor=#fefefe
| 37913 ||  || — || March 24, 1998 || Socorro || LINEAR || NYS || align=right | 2.0 km || 
|-id=914 bgcolor=#E9E9E9
| 37914 ||  || — || March 24, 1998 || Socorro || LINEAR || — || align=right | 4.1 km || 
|-id=915 bgcolor=#E9E9E9
| 37915 ||  || — || March 31, 1998 || Socorro || LINEAR || — || align=right | 3.0 km || 
|-id=916 bgcolor=#E9E9E9
| 37916 ||  || — || March 31, 1998 || Socorro || LINEAR || EUN || align=right | 3.6 km || 
|-id=917 bgcolor=#fefefe
| 37917 ||  || — || March 31, 1998 || Socorro || LINEAR || KLI || align=right | 6.0 km || 
|-id=918 bgcolor=#E9E9E9
| 37918 ||  || — || March 31, 1998 || Socorro || LINEAR || — || align=right | 5.4 km || 
|-id=919 bgcolor=#fefefe
| 37919 ||  || — || March 31, 1998 || Socorro || LINEAR || — || align=right | 4.3 km || 
|-id=920 bgcolor=#E9E9E9
| 37920 ||  || — || March 31, 1998 || Socorro || LINEAR || — || align=right | 3.8 km || 
|-id=921 bgcolor=#E9E9E9
| 37921 ||  || — || March 31, 1998 || Socorro || LINEAR || PAD || align=right | 5.7 km || 
|-id=922 bgcolor=#E9E9E9
| 37922 ||  || — || March 31, 1998 || Socorro || LINEAR || — || align=right | 5.0 km || 
|-id=923 bgcolor=#d6d6d6
| 37923 ||  || — || March 31, 1998 || Socorro || LINEAR || ALA || align=right | 13 km || 
|-id=924 bgcolor=#E9E9E9
| 37924 ||  || — || March 31, 1998 || Socorro || LINEAR || — || align=right | 3.6 km || 
|-id=925 bgcolor=#E9E9E9
| 37925 ||  || — || March 31, 1998 || Socorro || LINEAR || ADE || align=right | 8.2 km || 
|-id=926 bgcolor=#E9E9E9
| 37926 ||  || — || March 31, 1998 || Socorro || LINEAR || — || align=right | 4.0 km || 
|-id=927 bgcolor=#E9E9E9
| 37927 ||  || — || March 31, 1998 || Socorro || LINEAR || — || align=right | 2.7 km || 
|-id=928 bgcolor=#E9E9E9
| 37928 ||  || — || March 20, 1998 || Socorro || LINEAR || — || align=right | 2.3 km || 
|-id=929 bgcolor=#E9E9E9
| 37929 ||  || — || March 20, 1998 || Socorro || LINEAR || — || align=right | 6.6 km || 
|-id=930 bgcolor=#E9E9E9
| 37930 ||  || — || March 20, 1998 || Socorro || LINEAR || EUN || align=right | 5.0 km || 
|-id=931 bgcolor=#E9E9E9
| 37931 ||  || — || March 24, 1998 || Socorro || LINEAR || — || align=right | 3.4 km || 
|-id=932 bgcolor=#E9E9E9
| 37932 ||  || — || March 22, 1998 || Socorro || LINEAR || — || align=right | 4.4 km || 
|-id=933 bgcolor=#d6d6d6
| 37933 ||  || — || March 29, 1998 || Socorro || LINEAR || THM || align=right | 6.1 km || 
|-id=934 bgcolor=#E9E9E9
| 37934 ||  || — || March 29, 1998 || Socorro || LINEAR || EUN || align=right | 4.1 km || 
|-id=935 bgcolor=#E9E9E9
| 37935 || 1998 GW || — || April 3, 1998 || Kitt Peak || Spacewatch || RAF || align=right | 4.0 km || 
|-id=936 bgcolor=#E9E9E9
| 37936 ||  || — || April 4, 1998 || Woomera || F. B. Zoltowski || DOR || align=right | 8.4 km || 
|-id=937 bgcolor=#E9E9E9
| 37937 ||  || — || April 2, 1998 || Socorro || LINEAR || MAR || align=right | 2.8 km || 
|-id=938 bgcolor=#E9E9E9
| 37938 ||  || — || April 2, 1998 || Socorro || LINEAR || — || align=right | 3.5 km || 
|-id=939 bgcolor=#E9E9E9
| 37939 Hašler || 1998 HA ||  || April 16, 1998 || Ondřejov || L. Kotková || — || align=right | 2.7 km || 
|-id=940 bgcolor=#E9E9E9
| 37940 ||  || — || April 19, 1998 || Kitt Peak || Spacewatch || — || align=right | 2.2 km || 
|-id=941 bgcolor=#E9E9E9
| 37941 Dawidowicz ||  ||  || April 22, 1998 || Caussols || ODAS || WIT || align=right | 3.4 km || 
|-id=942 bgcolor=#E9E9E9
| 37942 ||  || — || April 17, 1998 || Kitt Peak || Spacewatch || — || align=right | 2.4 km || 
|-id=943 bgcolor=#E9E9E9
| 37943 ||  || — || April 18, 1998 || Socorro || LINEAR || — || align=right | 2.2 km || 
|-id=944 bgcolor=#E9E9E9
| 37944 ||  || — || April 18, 1998 || Socorro || LINEAR || — || align=right | 3.6 km || 
|-id=945 bgcolor=#E9E9E9
| 37945 ||  || — || April 18, 1998 || Socorro || LINEAR || — || align=right | 3.2 km || 
|-id=946 bgcolor=#fefefe
| 37946 ||  || — || April 20, 1998 || Socorro || LINEAR || — || align=right | 1.9 km || 
|-id=947 bgcolor=#E9E9E9
| 37947 ||  || — || April 20, 1998 || Socorro || LINEAR || — || align=right | 2.6 km || 
|-id=948 bgcolor=#E9E9E9
| 37948 ||  || — || April 25, 1998 || Haleakala || NEAT || MAR || align=right | 4.1 km || 
|-id=949 bgcolor=#E9E9E9
| 37949 ||  || — || April 20, 1998 || Socorro || LINEAR || — || align=right | 3.8 km || 
|-id=950 bgcolor=#E9E9E9
| 37950 ||  || — || April 20, 1998 || Socorro || LINEAR || — || align=right | 3.0 km || 
|-id=951 bgcolor=#E9E9E9
| 37951 ||  || — || April 24, 1998 || Kitt Peak || Spacewatch || — || align=right | 3.1 km || 
|-id=952 bgcolor=#E9E9E9
| 37952 ||  || — || April 20, 1998 || Socorro || LINEAR || — || align=right | 2.3 km || 
|-id=953 bgcolor=#E9E9E9
| 37953 ||  || — || April 20, 1998 || Socorro || LINEAR || WIT || align=right | 2.3 km || 
|-id=954 bgcolor=#E9E9E9
| 37954 ||  || — || April 20, 1998 || Socorro || LINEAR || INO || align=right | 3.5 km || 
|-id=955 bgcolor=#E9E9E9
| 37955 ||  || — || April 29, 1998 || Kitt Peak || Spacewatch || — || align=right | 5.5 km || 
|-id=956 bgcolor=#E9E9E9
| 37956 ||  || — || April 21, 1998 || Socorro || LINEAR || — || align=right | 1.9 km || 
|-id=957 bgcolor=#E9E9E9
| 37957 ||  || — || April 21, 1998 || Socorro || LINEAR || GEF || align=right | 3.7 km || 
|-id=958 bgcolor=#E9E9E9
| 37958 ||  || — || April 21, 1998 || Socorro || LINEAR || — || align=right | 2.3 km || 
|-id=959 bgcolor=#E9E9E9
| 37959 ||  || — || April 21, 1998 || Socorro || LINEAR || — || align=right | 4.5 km || 
|-id=960 bgcolor=#E9E9E9
| 37960 ||  || — || April 21, 1998 || Socorro || LINEAR || — || align=right | 4.0 km || 
|-id=961 bgcolor=#E9E9E9
| 37961 ||  || — || April 21, 1998 || Socorro || LINEAR || GER || align=right | 3.9 km || 
|-id=962 bgcolor=#E9E9E9
| 37962 ||  || — || April 21, 1998 || Socorro || LINEAR || RAF || align=right | 2.9 km || 
|-id=963 bgcolor=#E9E9E9
| 37963 ||  || — || April 21, 1998 || Socorro || LINEAR || — || align=right | 4.4 km || 
|-id=964 bgcolor=#E9E9E9
| 37964 ||  || — || April 21, 1998 || Socorro || LINEAR || — || align=right | 4.1 km || 
|-id=965 bgcolor=#E9E9E9
| 37965 ||  || — || April 21, 1998 || Socorro || LINEAR || — || align=right | 5.5 km || 
|-id=966 bgcolor=#d6d6d6
| 37966 ||  || — || April 21, 1998 || Socorro || LINEAR || ALA || align=right | 12 km || 
|-id=967 bgcolor=#E9E9E9
| 37967 ||  || — || April 21, 1998 || Socorro || LINEAR || — || align=right | 3.7 km || 
|-id=968 bgcolor=#E9E9E9
| 37968 ||  || — || April 21, 1998 || Socorro || LINEAR || — || align=right | 5.4 km || 
|-id=969 bgcolor=#E9E9E9
| 37969 ||  || — || April 21, 1998 || Socorro || LINEAR || RAF || align=right | 2.8 km || 
|-id=970 bgcolor=#E9E9E9
| 37970 ||  || — || April 21, 1998 || Socorro || LINEAR || EUN || align=right | 5.6 km || 
|-id=971 bgcolor=#d6d6d6
| 37971 ||  || — || April 25, 1998 || La Silla || E. W. Elst || — || align=right | 6.3 km || 
|-id=972 bgcolor=#E9E9E9
| 37972 ||  || — || April 23, 1998 || Socorro || LINEAR || — || align=right | 2.6 km || 
|-id=973 bgcolor=#E9E9E9
| 37973 ||  || — || April 23, 1998 || Socorro || LINEAR || GEF || align=right | 4.8 km || 
|-id=974 bgcolor=#d6d6d6
| 37974 ||  || — || April 23, 1998 || Socorro || LINEAR || — || align=right | 5.1 km || 
|-id=975 bgcolor=#E9E9E9
| 37975 ||  || — || April 23, 1998 || Socorro || LINEAR || GEF || align=right | 3.4 km || 
|-id=976 bgcolor=#E9E9E9
| 37976 ||  || — || April 23, 1998 || Socorro || LINEAR || — || align=right | 4.5 km || 
|-id=977 bgcolor=#d6d6d6
| 37977 ||  || — || April 23, 1998 || Socorro || LINEAR || — || align=right | 15 km || 
|-id=978 bgcolor=#d6d6d6
| 37978 ||  || — || April 23, 1998 || Socorro || LINEAR || — || align=right | 11 km || 
|-id=979 bgcolor=#E9E9E9
| 37979 ||  || — || April 23, 1998 || Socorro || LINEAR || — || align=right | 4.5 km || 
|-id=980 bgcolor=#E9E9E9
| 37980 ||  || — || April 23, 1998 || Socorro || LINEAR || EUN || align=right | 3.2 km || 
|-id=981 bgcolor=#d6d6d6
| 37981 ||  || — || April 19, 1998 || Socorro || LINEAR || FIR || align=right | 3.6 km || 
|-id=982 bgcolor=#fefefe
| 37982 ||  || — || April 19, 1998 || Socorro || LINEAR || — || align=right | 3.2 km || 
|-id=983 bgcolor=#fefefe
| 37983 ||  || — || April 20, 1998 || Socorro || LINEAR || — || align=right | 4.0 km || 
|-id=984 bgcolor=#E9E9E9
| 37984 ||  || — || April 20, 1998 || Socorro || LINEAR || GEF || align=right | 3.6 km || 
|-id=985 bgcolor=#E9E9E9
| 37985 ||  || — || April 21, 1998 || Socorro || LINEAR || — || align=right | 5.0 km || 
|-id=986 bgcolor=#E9E9E9
| 37986 ||  || — || April 21, 1998 || Socorro || LINEAR || JUN || align=right | 2.4 km || 
|-id=987 bgcolor=#E9E9E9
| 37987 ||  || — || April 21, 1998 || Socorro || LINEAR || — || align=right | 2.2 km || 
|-id=988 bgcolor=#E9E9E9
| 37988 ||  || — || April 23, 1998 || Haleakala || NEAT || — || align=right | 2.8 km || 
|-id=989 bgcolor=#E9E9E9
| 37989 ||  || — || April 28, 1998 || Kitt Peak || Spacewatch || — || align=right | 6.4 km || 
|-id=990 bgcolor=#E9E9E9
| 37990 ||  || — || May 22, 1998 || Anderson Mesa || LONEOS || — || align=right | 3.6 km || 
|-id=991 bgcolor=#d6d6d6
| 37991 ||  || — || May 24, 1998 || Kitt Peak || Spacewatch || 2:1J || align=right | 7.0 km || 
|-id=992 bgcolor=#E9E9E9
| 37992 ||  || — || May 22, 1998 || Anderson Mesa || LONEOS || — || align=right | 5.0 km || 
|-id=993 bgcolor=#d6d6d6
| 37993 ||  || — || May 23, 1998 || Anderson Mesa || LONEOS || — || align=right | 6.6 km || 
|-id=994 bgcolor=#E9E9E9
| 37994 ||  || — || May 22, 1998 || Socorro || LINEAR || EUN || align=right | 4.7 km || 
|-id=995 bgcolor=#d6d6d6
| 37995 ||  || — || May 22, 1998 || Socorro || LINEAR || — || align=right | 6.7 km || 
|-id=996 bgcolor=#E9E9E9
| 37996 ||  || — || May 22, 1998 || Socorro || LINEAR || — || align=right | 4.2 km || 
|-id=997 bgcolor=#d6d6d6
| 37997 ||  || — || May 22, 1998 || Socorro || LINEAR || — || align=right | 7.2 km || 
|-id=998 bgcolor=#E9E9E9
| 37998 ||  || — || May 22, 1998 || Socorro || LINEAR || — || align=right | 2.9 km || 
|-id=999 bgcolor=#E9E9E9
| 37999 ||  || — || May 22, 1998 || Socorro || LINEAR || — || align=right | 5.8 km || 
|-id=000 bgcolor=#d6d6d6
| 38000 ||  || — || May 22, 1998 || Socorro || LINEAR || TEL || align=right | 5.6 km || 
|}

References

External links 
 Discovery Circumstances: Numbered Minor Planets (35001)–(40000) (IAU Minor Planet Center)

0037